= List of Everton F.C. records and statistics =

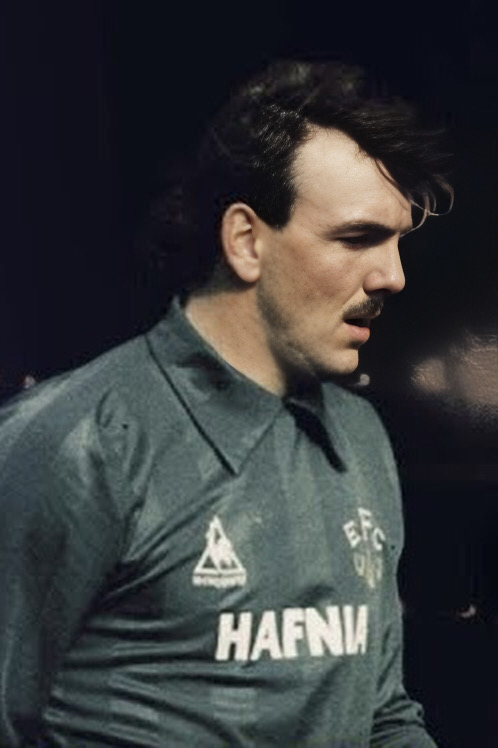
Neville Southall, Everton's record top appearance maker

Everton Football Club is a professional association football club located in Liverpool. The club was formed in 1878, and was originally named as St Domingo FC. The club's first game was a 1–0 victory over Everton Church Club. In November 1879, the club was renamed to Everton FC.

In 1888, Everton were one of the twelve founding members of the English Football League. The club have played in the top-flight of English Football for a record 117 years, having missed only four top-flight seasons (1930–31, 1951–52, 1952–53, 1953–54).

Major competitions won by Everton F.C., records set by the club, associated managers and players are included in the following list.

The player records section includes: appearances, goals scored and clean sheets kept. Player and manager awards, transfer fees, club records (Wins, Draws, and Losses) are all also included in the list, as well as several others.

== Honours ==
=== Domestic ===
- First Division:
  - Titles (9): 1890–91, 1914–15, 1927–28, 1931–32, 1938–39, 1962–63, 1969–70, 1984–85, 1986–87
  - Runners-up (7): 1889–90, 1894–95, 1901–02, 1904–05, 1908–09, 1911–12, 1985–86
- Second Division:
  - Titles (1): 1930–31
  - Runners-up (1): 1953–54
- FA Cup:
  - Titles (5): 1905–06, 1932–33, 1965–66, 1983–84, 1994–95
  - Runners-up (8): 1892–93, 1896–97, 1906–07, 1967–68, 1984–85, 1985–86, 1988–89, 2008–09
- Football League Cup:
  - Runners-up (2): 1976–77, 1983–84
- FA Charity Shield:
  - Titles (9): 1928, 1932, 1963, 1970, 1984, 1985, 1986 (shared), 1987, 1995
  - Runners-up (2): 1933, 1966
- Full Members Cup:
  - Runners-up (2): 1988–89, 1990–91
- Football League Super Cup:
  - Runners-up (1): 1985–86
- FA Youth Cup:
  - Titles (3): 1964–65, 1983–84, 1997–98
  - Runners-up (4): 1960–61, 1976–77, 1982–83, 2001–02
- Lancashire Senior Cup:
  - Titles (7): 1893–94, 1896–97, 1909–10, 1934–35, 1939–40, 1963–64, 2015–16
  - Runners-up (4): 1894–95, 1902–03, 1904–05, 1958–59

=== European ===
- European Cup Winners' Cup:
  - Winners: (1): 1984–85

=== Doubles ===
- 1984–85: League and European Cup Winners' Cup

=== Awards ===
- 1985 World Soccer Men's World Team of the Year
- 1985 France Football European Team of the Year

== Player records ==
As of 17 May 2026

(All current players are in bold. Appearance totals includes substitution appearances.)

=== Appearances ===
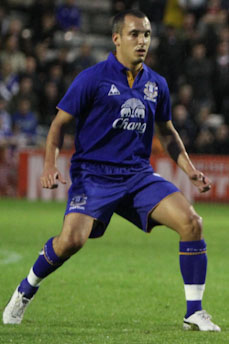
Leon Osman

- Youngest Player (All Competitions): Thierry Small, 16 years and 176 days (vs Sheffield Wednesday, 24 January 2021)
- Youngest Player in Europe: Jake Bidwell, 16 years and 271 days (vs BATE Borisov, 17 December 2009)
- Oldest Player: Ted Sagar, 42 years and 281 days (vs Plymouth Argyle, 15 November 1952)
- Most Appearances (All Competitions): Neville Southall, 750
- Most League Appearances: Neville Southall, 578
- Most FA Cup Appearances: Neville Southall, 70
- Most League Cup Appearances: Neville Southall, 65
- Most European Appearances: Tim Howard, 28
- Most Substitute Appearances: Victor Anichebe, 95

=== All competitions appearances ===
#	Name	Apps	Years
1	(Wales) Neville Southall	750	1981–1998
2	(England) Brian Labone	534	1957–1971
3	(England) Dave Watson	528	1986–2001
4	(England) Ted Sagar	497	1929–1953
5	(Wales) Kevin Ratcliffe	493	1980–1992
6	(England) Mick Lyons	473	1969–1982
7	(Scotland) Jack Taylor	456	1896–1909
8	(Republic of Ireland) Peter Farrell	453	1946–1957
9	(Scotland) Graeme Sharp	447	1980–1991
10	(Republic of Ireland) Seamus Coleman	435	2009–2026

=== All League appearances ===
#	Name	Apps	Years
1	(Wales) Neville Southall	578	1981–1998
2	(England) Ted Sagar	463	1929–1953
3	(England) Brian Labone	451	1958–1971
4	(England) Dave Watson	423	1986–2001
5	(Republic of Ireland) Peter Farrell	422	1946–1957
6	(Scotland) Jack Taylor	400	1896–1910
7	(England) Dixie Dean	399	1925–1937
8	(Republic of Ireland) Tommy Eglington	394	1946–1957
9	(England) Mick Lyons	390	1971–1982
10	(England) Tommy E. Jones	383	1950–1961

=== FA Cup appearances ===
#	Name	Apps	Years
1	(Wales) Neville Southall	70	1981–1998
2	(Wales) Kevin Ratcliffe	57	1980–1992
3	(Scotland) Jack Taylor	56	1896–1909
4	(Scotland) Graeme Sharp	54	1980–1991
5	(England) Harry Makepeace	52	1902–1914
6	(England) Dave Watson	48	1986–2001
7	(England) Brian Labone	46	1957–1971
8	(England) Jack Sharp	42	1900–1909
9	(England) Gordon West	40	1962–1975
10	(Scotland) Alex Young	39	1901–1910

=== League Cup appearances ===
#	Name	Apps	Years
1	(Wales) Neville Southall	65	1981–1998
2	(Scotland) Graeme Sharp	48	1980–1991
3	(Wales) Kevin Ratcliffe	46	1980–1992
4	(England) Dave Watson	39	1986–2001
5	(England) Mick Lyons	37	1969–1982
6	(England) Adrian Heath	35	1982–1988
7	(Republic of Ireland) Kevin Sheedy	32	1982–1992
8	(England) Gary Stevens	30	1982–1988
8	(England) Andy King	30	1976–1980; 1982–1984
10	(England) Bob Latchford	28	1973–1980

=== European appearances ===
#	Name	Apps	Years
1	(United States) Tim Howard	28	2006–2016
2	(England) Leon Osman	25	2000–2016
2	(England) Leighton Baines	25	2007–2020
4	(England) Tony Hibbert	24	2000–2016
5	(England) Phil Jagielka	23	2007–2019
6	(England) Brian Labone	19	1957–1971
6	(Australia) Tim Cahill	19	2004–2012
6	(England) Colin Harvey	19	1962–1974
6	(Nigeria) Joseph Yobo	19	2002–2012
10	(England) Johnny Morrissey	18	1962–1972
10	(England) Phil Neville	18	2005–2013
10	(Nigeria) Yakubu	18	2007–2011

=== Goalscorers ===
- Most goals in a season – 60, Dixie Dean
- Most goals in a single match – 6, Jack Southworth (vs West Bromwich Albion)
- Most league goals – 349, Dixie Dean
- Most FA Cup goals – 28, Dixie Dean
- Most League cup goals – 19, Bob Latchford
- Most European goals – 8, Romelu Lukaku
- Youngest goalscorer – James Vaughan, 16 yrs and 271 days (vs Crystal Palace, 10 April 2005) (Also Premier League record)
- Oldest goalscorer – Ashley Young, 39 yrs and 148 days (vs Wolverhampton Wanderers, 4 December 2024)

=== Top scorers (all competitions) ===
#	Name	Years	Goals	Apps	Avg.
1	(England) Dixie Dean	1925–1937	383	433	0.88
2	(Scotland) Graeme Sharp	1980–1991	160	447	0.36
3	(England) Bob Latchford	1974–1981	138	289	0.48
4	(Scotland) Alex Young	1901–1911	126	314	0.40
5	(England) Joe Royle	1966–1974	119	276	0.43
6	(Wales) Roy Vernon	1960–1965	111	200	0.56
7	(England) Dave Hickson	1948–1955; 1957–1959	109	243	0.45
8	(England) Edgar Chadwick	1888–1899	104	300	0.35
9	(England) Tony Cottee	1988–1994	99	241	0.41
10	(England) Alf Milward	1888–1897	98	224	0.44

=== League top scorers ===
#	Name	Years	Goals	Apps	Avg.
1	(England) Dixie Dean	1925–1937	349	399	0.87
2	(Scotland) Alex Young	1901–1911	112	275	0.41
3	(Scotland) Graeme Sharp	1980–1991	111	322	0.34
4	(England) Bob Latchford	1974–1981	106	236	0.45
5	(England) Joe Royle	1966–1974	102	232	0.44
6	(Wales) Roy Vernon	1960–1965	101	176	0.57
7	(England) Dave Hickson	1948–1955, 1957–1959	95	225	0.42
8	(England) Edgar Chadwick	1888–1899	92	270	0.34
9	(England) Alf Milward	1888–1897	85	201	0.42
10	(England) Jimmy Settle	1899–1908	83	237	0.35

=== FA Cup top scorers ===
#	Name	Years	Goals	Apps	Avg.
1	(England) Dixie Dean	1925–1937	28	32	0.88
2	(Scotland) Graeme Sharp	1980–1991	21	54	0.39
3	(England) Dave Hickson	1948–1955; 1957–1959	15	18	0.83
3	(Republic of Ireland) Kevin Sheedy	1982–1992	15	38	0.39
5	(Scotland) Alex Young	1901-1911	14	39	0.36
5	(Scotland) Jack Taylor	1896–1910	14	56	0.25
7	(England) Jimmy Settle	1899–1908	13	32	0.41
7	(England) Alf Milward	1888–1897	13	23	0.57
9	(England) Jack Sharp	1899–1910	12	42	0.29
9	(England) Edgar Chadwick	1888–1899	12	30	0.40

=== League Cup top scorers ===
	Name	Goals	Apps	Avg.
1	(England) Bob Latchford	19	28	0.68
2	(Scotland) Graeme Sharp	15	48	0.31
3	(England) Tony Cottee	11	23	0.48
3	(England) Adrian Heath	11	35	0.31
3	(England) Dominic Calvert-Lewin	11	13	0.85
6	(England) Andy King	10	30	0.33
7	(Republic of Ireland) Kevin Sheedy	9	32	0.28
8	(England) Martin Dobson	8	22	0.36
9	(England) Frank Wignall	7	3	2.33
9	(England) Paul Wilkinson	7	4	1.75
9	(England) Paul Rideout	7	13	0.53
9	(England) Dave Watson	7	39	0.17

=== European top scorers ===
#	Name	Goals	Apps	Avg.
1	(Belgium) Romelu Lukaku	8	9	0.89
2	(England) Fred Pickering	6	9	0.67
3	(Scotland) Andy Gray	5	3	1.66
4	(England) Andy King	4	6	0.67
4	(England) Joe Royle	4	6	0.67
4	(England) Andy Johnson	4	7	0.57
4	(Scotland) Graeme Sharp	4	8	0.50
4	(England) Alan Ball	4	10	0.40
4	(Nigeria) Victor Anichebe	4	11	0.36
4	(Spain) Mikel Arteta	4	14	0.29
4	(Nigeria) Yakubu	4	18	0.22
4	(Australia) Tim Cahill	4	19	0.21
4	(England) Phil Jagielka	4	23	0.17

=== Clean sheets ===
#	Name	Apps	Clean sheets
1	(Wales) Neville Southall	751	269
2	(England) Gordon West	402	155
3	(United States) Tim Howard	414	133
4	(England) Ted Sagar	497	119
5	(England) **Jordan Pickford**	358	100
6	(Ireland) Billy Scott	289	94
7	(England) Tom Fern	231	67
8	(Republic of Ireland) Jimmy O'Neill	213	49
9	(Scotland) George Wood	126	48
10	(England) Albert Dunlop	231	47

== Club records ==
=== Wins ===
- Most League wins in a season – 29 in 42 matches, First Division, 1969–70
- Fewest League wins in a season – 8 in 38 matches, Premier League, 2022–23

=== Defeats ===
- Most League defeats in a season – 22 in 42 matches, FA Premier League, 1993–94
- Fewest League defeats in a season – 1 in 22 matches, First Division, 1890–91

=== Goals ===
- Most League goals scored in a season – 121 in 42 matches, Second Division, 1930–31
- Fewest League goals scored in a season – 34 in 38 matches (2), 2005–06 and 2022–23, Premier League
- Most League goals conceded in a season – 92 in 42 matches, First Division, 1929–30
- Fewest League goals conceded in a season – 27 in 40 matches, First Division, 1987–88

=== Points ===
- Most points in a League season (2 for a win) – 66 in 42 matches, First Division, 1969–70
- Most points in a League season (3 for a win) – 90 in 42 matches, First Division, 1984–85
- Fewest points in a League season (2 for a win) – 20 in 22 matches, First Division, 1888–89
- Fewest points in a League season (3 for a win) – 36 in 38 matches, Premier League, 2022–23

=== Matches ===
==== Firsts ====
- First FA Cup match – v. Bolton Wanderers, First round, 12 November 1887 (drew 0–0) (Note: Everton originally drew Rangers F.C. in 1886 but only played it as a friendly as they had ineligible players. Although they beat Bolton in a replay, they didn't go through as they fielded 7 ineligible players. The game itself was a replay as the first game was declared void after Bolton had fielded an ineligible player.)
- First League match – v. Accrington, First Division, 8 September 1888 (won 2–1)
- First match at Goodison Park – v. Bolton Wanderers, 2 September 1892 (won 4–2)
- First League match at Goodison Park - v. Nottingham Forest, 3 September 1892 (drew 2-2)
- First European match – v. Dunfermline Athletic, Inter-Cities Fairs Cup, 25 September 1962 (won 1–0)
- First League Cup match – v. Accrington Stanley, First round, 12 October 1960 (won 3–1)

==== Record wins ====
- Record League Victory: 9–1 v Manchester City, 3 September 1906; v Plymouth Argyle, 27 December 1930 (Dixie Dean & Jimmy Stein both scored 4 goals, a first for Everton)
- Record FA Cup Victory: 11–2 v Derby County, FA Cup, 5th Round, 18 January 1890 (Hat-tricks from Fred Geary, Alec Brady and Alf Milward)
- Record League Cup Victory: 8–0 v Wimbledon, League Cup, 2nd Round, 29 August 1978
- Record Aggregate League Cup Victory: 11–0 v Wrexham, League Cup, 2nd Round, 1990
- Record European Victory: 6–1 v SK Brann, UEFA CUP, Round of 32, 21 February 2008
- Record Aggregate European Victory: 10–0 v Finn Harps, UEFA CUP, 1st Round, 1978
- Record Friendly Victory: 0–22 v ATV Irdning, 14 July 2018

==== Record away wins ====
- Record League Victory: 7–0 v Charlton Athletic, 7 February 1931
- Record FA Cup Victory: 6–0 v Crystal Palace, 4 January 1931
- Record Top Flight Victory: 6–1 v Derby County, 5 November 1892
- Record League Cup Victory: 5–0 v Wrexham, League Cup, 2nd Round 1st Leg, 25 September 1990
- Record European Victory: 5–0 v Finn Harps, UEFA Cup, 1st Round 1st Leg, 12 September 1978

==== Record defeats ====
- Record League Defeat: 0–7 v Sunderland, Football League Div 1, 26 December 1934; v Wolverhampton Wanderers, Football League Div 1, 22 February 1939; v Arsenal, Premier League, 11 May 2005
- Record FA Cup Defeat: 0–6 v Crystal Palace, FA Cup, 1st Round, 7 January 1922

=== Attendances ===
- Highest League Attendance 78,299 v Liverpool, 18 September 1948
- Highest FA Cup Attendance 77,902 v Manchester United, FA Cup, 5th Round, 14 February 1953
- Highest League Cup Attendance 54,032 v Bolton Wanderers, League Cup, Semi Final, 1st Leg, 18 January 1977
- Highest European Attendance 62,408 v Inter Milan, European Cup, 1st Round, 1st Leg, 18 September 1963
- Lowest League Attendance 7,802 v Sheffield Wednesday, 1 May 1934 (Note: During the 2019-20 and 2020-21 seasons, Everton played 21 home league matches behind closed doors and a further 3 matches with a reduced attendance due to the COVID pandemic. Prior to the start of official reporting of attendance figures in 1925-26, attendance estimates by the local press suggests there are possibly 14 other league matches with a lower attendance.)
- Lowest FA Cup Attendance 15,293 v Wimbledon, FA Cup, 3rd Round Replay, 12 January 1993 (Note: Prior to the start of official reporting of attendance figures in 1925-26, attendance estimates by the local press suggests there are possibly 2 other FA Cup matches with a lower attendance.)
- Lowest League Cup Attendance 7,415 v Wrexham, League Cup, 2nd Round, 2nd Leg, 9 October 1990 (Note: Only 2,000 supporters were allowed to attend the 2020-21 Quarter-final against Manchester United due to the COVID pandemic.)

== Transfer records ==
=== Highest transfer fees paid ===
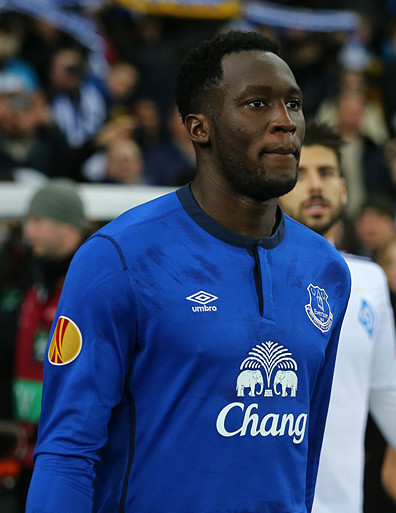
Romelu Lukaku, signed in July 2014 from Chelsea for £28 million, then Everton's most expensive purchase

	Name	From	Fee	Year
1	(Iceland) Gylfi Sigurðsson	(Wales) Swansea City	£45,000,000	2017
2	(Brazil) Richarlison	(England) Watford	£35,000,000	2018
3	(Belgium) Amadou Onana	(France) Lille	£30,000,000	2022
4	(Belgium) Romelu Lukaku	(England) Chelsea	£28,000,000	2014
5	(Nigeria) Alex Iwobi	(England) Arsenal	£28,000,000	2019
6	(Colombia) Yerry Mina	(Spain) Barcelona	£27,200,000	2018
8	(Italy) Moise Kean	(Italy) Juventus	£25,100,000	2019
9	(England) Jordan Pickford	(England) Sunderland	£25,000,000	2017
10	(England) Michael Keane	(England) Burnley	£25,000,000	2017
10	(Ivory Coast) Jean-Philippe Gbamin	(Germany) Mainz	£25,000,000	2019

=== Highest transfer fees received ===
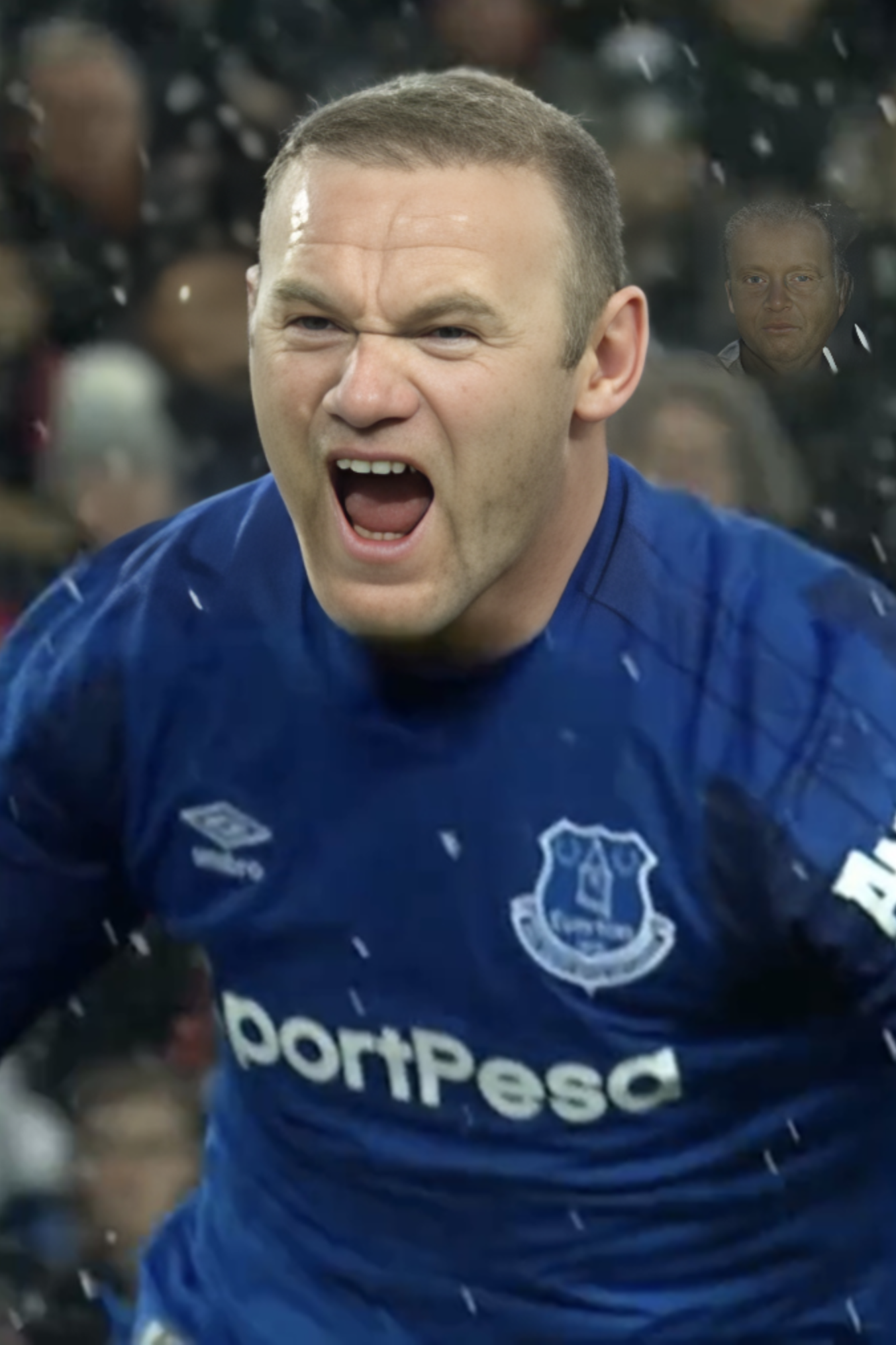
Wayne Rooney was sold to Manchester United for a then club record of £30 million in July 2004

	Name	From	Fee	Date
1	(Belgium) Romelu Lukaku	(England) Manchester United	£90,000,000	2017
2	(Brazil) Richarlison	(England) Tottenham Hotspur	£60,000,000	2022
3	(Belgium) Amadou Onana	(England) Aston Villa	£50,000,000	2024
4	(England) John Stones	(England) Manchester City	£50,000,000	2016
5	(England) Anthony Gordon	(England) Newcastle United	£50,000,000	2023
6	(England) Wayne Rooney	(England) Manchester United	£30,000,000	2004
7	(Senegal) Idrissa Gueye	(France) Paris Saint-Germain	£28,700,000	2019
8	(Belgium) Marouane Fellaini	(England) Manchester United	£27,500,000	2013
9	(France) Lucas Digne	(England) Aston Villa	£25,000,000	2022
10	(Italy) Moise Kean	(Italy) Juventus	£25,000,000	2023

== National records ==
- Goodison Park was the world's first purpose made and designed dedicated football ground.
- Goodison Park is the only English club ground to have hosted a World Cup semi-final. The ground of the club's Chilean namesakes, CD Everton, also hosted a World Cup semi-final, 4 years earlier.
- Goodison Park was the venue for England v Republic of Ireland 21 September 1949. England lost 2–0, suffering their first home defeat to a non-UK country. Everton's Peter Farrell scored.
- Everton were the first English club to appear in European competitions five seasons running (1962–63 to 1966–67).
- Everton have played in more top flight seasons than any other club.
- They have scored and conceded more top flight goals than any other club.
- Everton have both drawn and lost more top flight matches than any other side.
- They hold the distinction of being reigning League champions for the longest time (20 years, alongside Manchester United), although in unusual circumstances. They won the League championship in 1915 and thus remained reigning League champions until the 1919–20 season due to the cancellation of league football during World War I. They were also League champions in 1939, and again remained reigning League champions until the resumption of league football in 1946–47 after World War II.
- First club to be presented with the League Championship trophy and medals.
- First club to have the youngest Premiership goalscorer in two consecutive seasons with two different players
- First club to play 4000 top-flight games
- First club to amass 5000 League points
- First club to win the League Championship on two different home grounds. (Anfield and Goodison Park)
- First club to stage an FA Cup final
- First English club to install dugouts
- First English club to be invited to train at the Italian training HQ at Coverciano.
- First club to appear in 4 consecutive Charity Shields at Wembley 1984–1987.
- Jack Southworth's 6 goals v West Bromwich Albion, 30 December 1893, was the first such instance in Football League history.
- First club to wear the numbers 1 to 11, in any known fixture. The 1933 FA Cup final vs Manchester City

== Continental records ==
- First Club to be top of the ITunes chart, September 2020. Everton F.C. Spirit of the Blues.
- Goodison Park, built in 1892, was the world's first complete purpose-built football ground.
- Everton were the first club to install undersoil heating in their stadium.
- First club to win a penalty shoot-out in the European Cup – 1970 v Borussia Mönchengladbach
- First club to issue a regular match programme for home fixtures.
- First club to have a four-sided stadium with two tier stands
- First club to have a stadium with a three-tier stand

== Penalty shoot-outs ==
Season	Date	Competition	Round	Opponent	Venue	Result	Score
1970/71	4 November 1970	European Cup	Third Round	Borussia Monchengladbach	Home	Won	4–3
1986/87	3 March 1987	Full Members Cup	Quarter Finals	Charlton Athletic	Home	Lost	1–3
1987/88	8 December 1987	Dubai Champions Cup	Final	Rangers	Neutral	Lost	7–8
1998/99	11 November 1998	League Cup	Fourth Round	Sunderland AFC	Home	Lost	4–5
2000/01	27 September 2000	League Cup	Second Round	Bristol Rovers	Away	Lost	2–4
2001/02	12 September 2001	League Cup	Second Round	Crystal Palace	Home	Lost	4–5
2002/03	6 November 2002	League Cup	Third Round	Newcastle United	Home	Won	3–2
2003/04	3 December 2003	League Cup	Fourth Round	Middlesbrough	Away	Lost	4–5
2007/08	12 March 2008	UEFA Cup	Round of 16	Fiorentina	Home	Lost	2–4
2008/09	19 April 2009	FA Cup	Semi Finals	Manchester United	Neutral	Won	4–2
2010/11	21 September 2010	League Cup	Third Round	Brentford	Away	Lost	3–4
2010/11	19 February 2011	FA Cup	Fourth Round	Chelsea	Away	Won	4–3
2014/15	13 January 2015	FA Cup	Third Round	West Ham United	Away	Lost	8–9
2015/16	27 October 2015	League Cup	Fourth Round	Norwich City	Home	Won	4–3
2018/19	2 October 2018	EFL Cup	Third Round	Southampton	Home	Lost	3–4
2019/20	18 December 2019	EFL Cup	Quarter Finals	Leicester City	Home	Lost	2–4
2021/22	21 September 2021	EFL Cup	Third Round	Queens Park Rangers	Away	Lost	7–8
2023/24	19 December 2023	EFL Cup	Quarter Finals	Fulham FC	Home	Lost	6–7
2024/25	17 September 2024	EFL Cup	Third Round	Southampton	Home	Lost	5–6
2025/26	10 January 2026	FA Cup	Third Round	Sunderland	Home	Lost	0–3

== Player awards ==
=== Player of the Season ===
The Fans' Player of the Season is determined through a vote on the Everton website, in which five candidates are nominated by the club. Fans are then free to vote for their player of choice. The player with the greatest number of votes wins the award. This award has been presented from 2006 onward.

Season	Name	Position
2005–06	(Spain) Mikel Arteta	Midfielder
2006–07	(Spain) Mikel Arteta	Midfielder
2007–08	(England) Joleon Lescott	Defender
2008–09	(England) Phil Jagielka	Defender
2009–10	(South Africa) Steven Pienaar	Forward
2010–11	(England) Leighton Baines	Defender
2011–12	(Netherlands) John Heitinga	Defender
2012–13	(England) Leighton Baines	Defender
2013–14	(Republic of Ireland) Séamus Coleman	Defender
2014–15	(England) Phil Jagielka	Defender
2015–16	(England) Gareth Barry	Midfielder
2016–17	(Belgium) Romelu Lukaku	Forward
2017–18	(England) **Jordan Pickford**	Goalkeeper
2018–19	(France) Lucas Digne	Defender
2019–20	(Brazil) Richarlison	Forward
2020–21	(England) Dominic Calvert-Lewin	Forward
2021–22	(England) **Jordan Pickford**	Goalkeeper
2022–23	(England) **Jordan Pickford**	Goalkeeper
2023–24	(England) **Jordan Pickford**	Goalkeeper
2024–25	(Senegal) **Idrissa Gueye**	Midfielder
2025–26	(England) **James Garner**	Midfielder

- Notes: Players in **bold** are still playing for Everton.

=== Everton Giants ===
The following players are considered "Giants" for their great contributions to Everton. A panel appointed by the club established the inaugural list in 2000 and a new inductee is announced every season.

Inducted	Name	Position	Playing career	Managerial career	Appearances	Goals
2026	Leighton Baines	LB	2007–2020	2025 (caretaker)	420	39
2025	Andy Gray	FW	1983–1985		66	22
2025	Kevin Sheedy	MF	1982–1992		369	97
2025	Paul Bracewell	MF	1984–1989		145	10
2025	Derek Mountfield	CB	1982–1988		148	24
2020	Pat Van Den Hauwe	LB	1984–1989		135	2
2020	Gary Stevens	RB	1981–1988		208	8
2019	David Unsworth	LB	1992–1997, 1998–2004	2016, 2017 (caretaker)	350	40
2018	Adrian Heath	FW	1982–1988		307	93
2017	Roy Vernon	FW	1960–1965		202	111
2016	Tommy Wright	FB	1964–1974		374	4
2015	Mick Lyons	DF	1971–1982		390	48
2014	Bobby Collins	FW	1958–1962		147	48
2013	Derek Temple	FW	1957–1967		234	72
2012	Brian Labone	CB	1958–1971		451	2
2011	Duncan Ferguson	FW	1994–1998, 2000–2006	2019, 2022 (caretaker)	273	72
2010	Trevor Steven	MF	1983–1989		210	48
2009	Harry Catterick	FW	1946–1951	1961–1973	59	19
2008	Gordon West	GK	1962–1973		402	0
2007	Colin Harvey	MF	1963–1974	1987–1990	384	24
2006	Peter Reid	MF	1982–1989		234	13
2005	Graeme Sharp	FW	1980–1991		447	159
2004	Joe Royle	FW	1966–1974	1994–1997	276	119
2003	Kevin Ratcliffe	CB	1980–1992		461	2
2002	Ray Wilson	LB	1964–1969		153	0
2001	Alan Ball	MF	1966–1971		254	80
2000	Howard Kendall (Note: Kendall's status reflects his accomplishments as a manager in addition to his place in the "Holy Trinity" midfield of the 1960s.)	MF	1967–1974, 1981	1981–1987, 1990–1993, 1997–1998	276	30
2000	Dave Watson	CB	1986–2001	1997 (caretaker)	522	38
2000	Neville Southall	GK	1981–1998		751	0
2000	Bob Latchford	FW	1974–1981		286	138
2000	Alex Young	FW	1960–1968		272	89
2000	Dave Hickson	FW	1948–1955		243	111
2000	T. G. Jones	CB	1936–1950		178	5
2000	Ted Sagar	GK	1929–1953		500	0
2000	Dixie Dean	FW	1925–1937		433	383
2000	Sam Chedgzoy	MF	1910–1926		300	36
2000	Jack Sharp	MF	1899–1910		342	80

== Players' individual awards while at Everton ==
European Footballer of the Year (Ballon d'Or)
1986: (England) Gary Lineker (2nd)

African Footballer of the Year
1994: (Nigeria) Daniel Amokachi (3rd) (Note: Afrique Football award (Etoile d'Or))
1995: (Nigeria) Daniel Amokachi (3rd) (Note: CAF Award)

Oceania Footballer of the Year
2004: (Australia) Tim Cahill (Winner)

Football Writers' Association Footballer of the Year
1985: (Wales) Neville Southall
1986: (England) Gary Lineker

PFA Players' Player of the Year
1985: (England) Peter Reid
1986: (England) Gary Lineker

PFA Merit Award
1977: (Scotland) Jack Taylor
1982: Joe Mercer
1986: Alan Ball (As 1966 England World Cup Squad)
1986: Ray Wilson (As 1966 England World Cup Squad)
1994: (Northern Ireland) Billy Bingham
1997: Peter Beardsley

Premier League Player of the Month Award
February 1995: (Scotland) Duncan Ferguson
April 1996: (Russia) Andrei Kanchelskis
April 1999: (England) Kevin Campbell
September 2006: (England) Andy Johnson
February 2009: (England) Phil Jagielka
April 2012: (Croatia) Nikica Jelavić
November 2012: (Belgium) Marouane Fellaini
March 2017: (Belgium) Romelu Lukaku
September 2020: (England) Dominic Calvert-Lewin
September 2025: (England) Jack Grealish

Premier League Goal of the Month Award
November 2017: (England) Wayne Rooney
September 2021: (England) Andros Townsend
November/December 2022: (Jamaica) Demarai Gray

Premier League Save of the Season Award
2021–22: (England) Jordan Pickford
2025–26: (England) Jordan Pickford

Premier League Save of the Month Award
September 2022: (England) Jordan Pickford
January 2024: (England) Jordan Pickford
November 2025: (England) Jordan Pickford
February 2026: (England) Jordan Pickford

BBC Wales Sports Personality of the Year Award
1995: Neville Southall

BBC Young Sports Personality of the Year Award
2003: (England) Wayne Rooney

U.S. Soccer Athlete of the Year
2008: (United States) Tim Howard
2014: (United States) Tim Howard

Icelandic Footballer of the Year
2017: (Iceland) Gylfi Sigurðsson
2018: (Iceland) Gylfi Sigurðsson
2019: (Iceland) Gylfi Sigurðsson
2020: (Iceland) Gylfi Sigurðsson

== Managers' individual awards while at Everton ==
Barclays Bank Manager of the Year

1984–85: (England) Howard Kendall

1986–87: (England) Howard Kendall

LMA Manager of the Year

2002–03: (Scotland) David Moyes

2004–05: (Scotland) David Moyes

2008–09: (Scotland) David Moyes

Bell's Scotch Whisky/Barclays Bank Manager of the Month Award

October 1969: (England) Harry Catterick

March 1970: (England) Harry Catterick

October 1973: (Northern Ireland) Billy Bingham

November 1977: (England) Gordon Lee (Note: Gordon Lee had the gallon bottle of whisky he received split into miniatures to be given out to the clubs fans. "Cheers, Gordon!". EFC Heritage Society Twitter feed.)

October 1978: (England) Gordon Lee

September 1981: (England) Howard Kendall

February 1984: (England) Howard Kendall

October 1984: (England) Howard Kendall

April 1985: (England) Howard Kendall

February 1986: (England) Howard Kendall

December 1986: (England) Howard Kendall

Premier League Manager of the Month Award

January 1998: (England) Howard Kendall

September 1999: (Scotland) Walter Smith

November 2003: (Scotland) David Moyes

September 2004: (Scotland) David Moyes

January 2006: (Scotland) David Moyes

February 2008: (Scotland) David Moyes

February 2009: (Scotland) David Moyes

January 2010: (Scotland) David Moyes

March 2010: (Scotland) David Moyes

October 2010: (Scotland) David Moyes

September 2012: (Scotland) David Moyes

March 2013: (Scotland) David Moyes

September 2020: (Italy) Carlo Ancelotti

April 2024: (England) Sean Dyche

February 2025: (Scotland) David Moyes

== See also ==
- Football records in England
