= 1968–69 Everton F.C. season =

English football club season

Everton
1968–69 season
- Manager: Harry Catterick
- Ground: Goodison Park
- First Division: 3rd
- FA Cup: Semi-Final
- League Cup: Fourth round
- Top goalscorer: League: Joe Royle (23); All: Joe Royle (29)
Home colours	Away colours

During the 1968–69 English football season, Everton F.C. competed in the Football League First Division.

== Final League Table ==
Pos	Team	Pld	W	D	L	F	A	W	D	L	F	A	F	A	GA	GD	Pts
1	Leeds United	42	18	3	0	41	9	9	10	2	25	17	66	26	2.538	+ 40	67
2	Liverpool	42	16	4	1	36	10	9	7	5	27	14	63	24	2.625	+ 39	61
3	Everton	42	14	5	2	43	10	7	10	4	34	26	77	36	2.139	+ 41	57
4	Arsenal	42	12	6	3	31	12	10	6	5	25	15	56	27	2.074	+ 29	56
5	Chelsea	42	11	7	3	40	24	9	3	9	33	29	73	53	1.377	+ 20	50
6	Tottenham Hotspur	42	10	8	3	39	22	4	9	8	22	29	61	51	1.196	+ 10	45
7	Southampton	42	13	5	3	41	21	3	8	10	16	27	57	48	1.188	+ 9	45
8	West Ham United	42	10	8	3	47	22	3	10	8	19	28	66	50	1.320	+ 16	44
9	Newcastle United	42	12	7	2	40	20	3	7	11	21	35	61	55	1.109	+ 6	44
10	West Bromwich Albion	42	11	7	3	43	26	5	4	12	21	41	64	67	0.955	– 3	43
11	Manchester United	42	13	5	3	38	18	2	7	12	19	35	57	53	1.075	+ 4	42
12	Ipswich Town	42	10	4	7	32	26	5	7	9	27	34	59	60	0.983	– 1	41
13	Manchester City	42	13	6	2	49	20	2	4	15	15	35	64	55	1.164	+ 9	40
14	Burnley	42	11	6	4	36	25	4	3	14	19	57	55	82	0.671	– 27	39
15	Sheffield Wednesday	42	7	9	5	27	26	3	7	11	14	28	41	54	0.759	– 13	36
16	Wolverhampton Wanderers	42	7	10	4	26	22	3	5	13	15	36	41	58	0.707	– 17	35
17	Sunderland	42	10	6	5	28	18	1	6	14	15	49	43	67	0.642	– 24	34
18	Nottingham Forest	42	6	6	9	17	22	4	7	10	28	35	45	57	0.789	– 13	33
19	Stoke City	42	9	7	5	24	24	0	8	13	16	39	40	63	0.635	– 23	33
20	Coventry City	42	8	6	7	32	22	2	5	14	14	42	46	64	0.719	– 18	31
21	Leicester City	42	8	8	5	27	24	1	4	16	12	44	39	68	0.574	– 29	30
22	Queens Park Rangers	42	4	7	10	20	33	0	3	18	19	62	39	95	0.411	– 56	18

P = Matches played; W = Matches won; D = Matches drawn; L = Matches lost; F = Goals for; A = Goals against; GA = Goal average; GD = Goal difference; Pts = Points

Key	
	League Champions, qualified for European Cup
	FA Cup winners, qualified for Cup Winners' Cup
	Inter-Cities Fairs Cup 1968–69
	Relegated

== Results ==
Win	Draw	Loss

=== Football League First Division ===
10 August 1968 1	Manchester United	2-1	Everton	Trafford, Greater Manchester
	G. Best 21'; B. Charlton 28'		Ball 26'	Stadium: Old Trafford; Attendance: 61,311

13 August 1968 2	Everton	3-0	Burnley	Walton, Liverpool
	Royle 27'; Ball 35'; Husband 70'			Stadium: Goodison Park; Attendance: 48,903

17 August 1968 3	Everton	0-2	Tottenham Hotspur	Walton, Liverpool
			J. Greaves 35'; M. Chivers 81'	Stadium: Goodison Park; Attendance: 56,570

19 August 1968 4	West Ham United	1-4	Everton	Upton Park, London
	M. Peters 51'		Husband 15'; Royle 66'; Ball 70'; Harvey 88'	Stadium: Boleyn Ground; Attendance: 34,895

24 August 1968 5	Newcastle United	0-0	Everton	Newcastle upon Tyne
				Stadium: St James' Park; Attendance: 38,851

27 August 1968 6	Everton	0-0	Liverpool	Walton, Liverpool
				Stadium: Goodison Park; Attendance: 63,938

31 August 1968 7	Everton	2-1	Nottingham Forest	Walton, Liverpool
	Hurst 54'; Royle 64'		S. Chapman 84'	Stadium: Goodison Park; Attendance: 45,951

7 September 1968 8	Chelsea	1-1	Everton	Fulham, London
	P. Osgood 72' (pen.)		Morrissey 3'	Stadium: Stamford Bridge; Attendance: 42,017

14 September 1968 9	Everton	3-0	Sheffield Wednesday	Walton, Liverpool
	Husband 40'; Humphreys 56'; Royle 67' (pen.)			Stadium: Goodison Park; Attendance: 44,517

21 September 1968 10	Coventry City	2-2	Everton	Coventry
	M. Setters 9'; I. Gibson 41'		Husband 24'; Hurst 29'	Stadium: Highfield Road; Attendance: 37,846

28 September 1968 11	Everton	4-0	West Bromwich Albion	Walton, Liverpool
	Ball 2', 58', 72' (pen.); Harvey 65'			Stadium: Goodison Park; Attendance: 47,792

5 October 1968 12	Everton	2-0	Manchester City	Walton, Liverpool
	Ball 27'; Royle 37'			Stadium: Goodison Park; Attendance: 55,399

8 October 1968 13	Liverpool	1-1	Everton	Anfield, Liverpool
	T. Smith 75'		Ball 65'	Stadium: Anfield; Attendance: 54,496

12 October 1968 14	Southampton	2-5	Everton	Southampton, Hampshire
	J. Gabriel 15'; F. Kemp 74'		Husband 52', 82'; Ball 59'; Wright 61'; Royle 81'	Stadium: The Dell; Attendance: 21,688

19 October 1968 15	Everton	2-1	Stoke City	Walton, Liverpool
	Harvey 23'; Hurst 28'		D. Herd 48'	Stadium: Goodison Park; Attendance: 42,887

26 October 1968 16	Wolverhampton Wanderers	1-2	Everton	Wolverhampton, West Midlands
	P. Knowles 50'		Royle 20'; Ball 63' (pen.)	Stadium: Molineux Stadium; Attendance: 34,744

2 November 1968 17	Everton	2-0	Sunderland	Walton, Liverpool
	Ball 36'; Morrissey 44'			Stadium: Goodison Park; Attendance: 40,492

9 November 1968 18	Ipswich Town	2-2	Everton	Ipswich, Suffolk
	R. Crawford 18'; P. Morris 49'		Royle 8', 74'	Stadium: Portman Road; Attendance: 23,049

16 November 1968 19	Everton	4-0	Queen's Park Rangers	Walton, Liverpool
	Morrissey 30'; Harvey 57'; Royle 60' (pen.); Husband 64'			Stadium: Goodison Park; Attendance: 43,552

23 November 1968 20	Leeds United	2-1	Everton	Leeds, West Yorkshire
	J. Giles 8' (pen.); E. Gray 75'		Royle 24'	Stadium: Elland Road; Attendance: 41,716

30 November 1968 21	Everton	7-1	Leicester City	Walton, Liverpool
	Royle 17', 60', 68'; Ball 24'; Humphreys 34'; Hurst 56'; Husband 90' (pen.)		R. Fern 63'	Stadium: Goodison Park; Attendance: 42,492

7 December 1968 22	Arsenal	3-1	Everton	Highbury, London
	J. Radford 11'; D. Court 34'; G. Graham 90'		Ball 65'	Stadium: Arsenal Stadium; Attendance: 40,108

14 December 1968 23	Everton	1-0	Southampton	Walton, Liverpool
	Hurst 32'			Stadium: Goodison Park; Attendance: 36,299

21 December 1968 24	Stoke City	0-0	Everton	Stoke-on-Trent
				Stadium: Victoria Ground; Attendance: 20,507

26 December 1968 25	Manchester City	1-3	Everton	Moss Side, Manchester
	C. Bell 25'		Royle 1'; Husband 9', 83'	Stadium: Maine Road; Attendance: 53,549

11 January 1969 26	Sunderland	1-3	Everton	Roker, Sunderland
	C. Suggett 5'		Royle 8', 60'; Kendall 41'	Stadium: Roker Park; Attendance: 24,106

18 January 1969 27	Everton	2-2	Ipswich Town	Walton, Liverpool
	Brown 28'; Husband 77'		R. Crawford 38', 55'	Stadium: Goodison Park; Attendance: 40,925

28 January 1969 28	Everton	4-0	Wolverhampton Wanderers	Walton, Liverpool
	Royle 21' (pen.), 82'; Morrissey 43'; Husband 71'			Stadium: Goodison Park; Attendance: 48,057

1 February 1969 29	Queen's Park Rangers	0-1	Everton	White City, London
			Husband 10'	Stadium: Loftus Road; Attendance: 26,476

8 March 1969 30	Tottenham Hotspur	1-1	Everton	Tottenham, North London
	R. Morgan 86'		Royle 40'	Stadium: White Hart Lane; Attendance: 44,882

10 March 1969 31	Everton	0-0	Manchester United	Walton, Liverpool
				Stadium: Goodison Park; Attendance: 57,514

29 March 1969 32	Everton	1-2	Chelsea	Walton, Liverpool
	Royle 48' (pen.)		I. Hutchinson 17'; A. Birchenall 58'	Stadium: Goodison Park; Attendance: 42,190

1 April 1969 33	Everton	1-0	West Ham United	Walton, Liverpool
	Husband 38'			Stadium: Goodison Park; Attendance: 36,738

5 April 1969 34	West Bromwich Albion	1-1	Everton	West Bromwich, West Midlands
	J. Astle 42'		Ball 87' (pen.)	Stadium: The Hawthorns; Attendance: 23,156

8 April 1969 35	Burnley	1-2	Everton	Burnley, Lancashire
	R. Coates 50'		Ball 28'; Husband 38'	Stadium: Turf Moor; Attendance: 17,134

12 April 1969 36	Everton	3-0	Coventry City	Walton, Liverpool
	Hurst 31'; Husband 62'; Royle 74'			Stadium: Goodison Park; Attendance: 36,165

14 April 1969 37	Everton	1-1	Newcastle United	Walton, Liverpool
	Husband 44'		W. Davies 51'	Stadium: Goodison Park; Attendance: 36,035

19 April 1969 38	Sheffield Wednesday	2-2	Everton	Owlerton, Sheffield
	J. Ritchie 42'; B. Woodhall 74'		Hurst 70'; Husband 72'	Stadium: Hillsborough Stadium; Attendance: 23,060

22 April 1969 39	Everton	0-0	Leeds United	Walton, Liverpool
				Stadium: Goodison Park; Attendance: 59,022

25 April 1969 40	Nottingham Forest	1-0	Everton	West Bridgford, Nottinghamshire
	D. Hilley 11'			Stadium: City Ground; Attendance: 26,629

29 April 1969 41	Everton	1-0	Arsenal	Walton, Liverpool
	Husband 6'			Stadium: Goodison Park; Attendance: 39,689

14 May 1969 42	Leicester City	1-1	Everton	Leicester
	G. Cross 55'		Ball 12'	Stadium: Filbert Street; Attendance: 41,130

=== FA Cup ===
4 January 1969 3rd	Everton	2–1	Ipswich Town	Walton, Liverpool
	Royle 29'; Hurst 42'		J. O'Rourke 50'	Stadium: Goodison Park; Attendance: 49,047

25 January 1969 4th	Everton	2–0	Coventry City	Walton, Liverpool
	Royle 27'; Hurst 88'			Stadium: Goodison Park; Attendance: 53,441

12 February 1969 5th	Everton	1–0	Bristol Rovers	Walton, Liverpool
	Royle 33'			Stadium: Goodison Park; Attendance: 53,294

1 March 1969 6th	Manchester United	0–1	Everton	Trafford, Greater Manchester
			Royle 77'	Stadium: Old Trafford; Attendance: 63,464

29 March 1969 SF	Manchester City	1-0	Everton	Aston, Birmingham
	T. Booth 89'			Stadium: Villa Park; Attendance: 63,025

=== League Cup ===
3 September 1968 2nd	Everton	4–0	Tranmere Rovers	Walton, Liverpool
	Whittle; Ball; Royle			Stadium: Goodison Park; Attendance: 35,477

24 September 1968 3rd	Everton	5–1	Luton Town	Walton, Liverpool
	Husband 2'; Royle 7', 83' (pen.); Ball 43'; Morrissey 90'		L. Sheffield 72'	Stadium: Goodison Park; Attendance: 30,405

16 October 1968 4th	Everton	0–0	Derby County	Walton, Liverpool
				Stadium: Goodison Park; Attendance: 44,795

23 October 1968 4th (replay)	Derby County	1–0	Everton	Derby, Derbyshire
	K. Hector 30'			Stadium: Baseball Ground; Attendance: 34,370
