= 1969–70 Everton F.C. season =

English football club season

Everton
1969–70 season
- Manager: Harry Catterick
- Ground: Goodison Park
- First Division: 1st
- FA Cup: Third Round
- League Cup: Fourth Round
- Top goalscorer: League: Joe Royle (23); All: Joe Royle (23)
Home colours	Away colours

During the 1969–70 English football season, Everton F.C. competed in the Football League First Division. They won their 7th League title finishing ahead of Leeds United and Chelsea.

== Final league table ==
Pos	Team	Pld	W	D	L	GF	GA	GAv	Pts	Qualification or relegation
1	Everton (C)	42	29	8	5	72	34	2.118	66	Qualification for the European Cup first round
2	Leeds United	42	21	15	6	84	49	1.714	57	Qualification for the Inter-Cities Fairs Cup first round
3	Chelsea	42	21	13	8	70	50	1.400	55	Qualification for the Cup Winners' Cup first round (Note: Chelsea qualified for the Cup Winners' Cup first round as the 1969–70 FA Cup winners.)
4	Derby County	42	22	9	11	64	37	1.730	53	Qualification for the Watney Cup (Note: Derby County and Manchester United qualified for the Watney Cup as the two teams with the most goals that hadn't already qualified for a European competition.)
5	Liverpool	42	20	11	11	65	42	1.548	51	Qualification for the Inter-Cities Fairs Cup first round

Source: World Football
Rules for classification: 1) Points; 2) Goal average; 3) Goals scored
(C) Champions

== Results ==
Win	Draw	Loss

=== Football League First Division ===
9 August 1969 1	Arsenal	0–1	Everton	London
			Hurst 84'	Stadium: Highbury; Attendance: 44,364

13 August 1969 2	Manchester United	0–2	Everton	Manchester
			Hurst 38'; Ball 70'	Stadium: Old Trafford; Attendance: 57,752

16 August 1969 3	Everton	2–1	Crystal Palace	Liverpool
	Morrissey 42'; Royle 69' (pen.)		Taylor 6'	Stadium: Goodison Park; Attendance: 51,241

19 August 1969 4	Everton	3–0	Manchester United	Liverpool
	Ball 9'; Morrissey 21'; Royle 26'			Stadium: Goodison Park; Attendance: 53,185

23 August 1969 5	Manchester City	1–1	Everton	Manchester
	Bowyer 53'		Morrissey 2'	Stadium: Maine Road; Attendance: 43,366

26 August 1969 6	Everton	2–1	Sheffield Wednesday	Liverpool
	Ball 28'; Royle 77'		Smith 62'	Stadium: Goodison Park; Attendance: 46,480

30 August 1969 7	Everton	3–2	Leeds United	Liverpool
	Husband 4'; Royle 21', 49'		Bremner 52'; Clarke 75'	Stadium: Goodison Park; Attendance: 53,253

6 September 1969 8	Derby County	2–1	Everton	Derby
	O'Hare 38'; Hector 65'		Kendall 68'	Stadium: Baseball Ground; Attendance: 37,708

13 September 1969 9	Everton	2–0	West Ham United	Liverpool
	Ball 72'; Husband 76'			Stadium: Goodison Park; Attendance: 49,052

17 September 1969 10	Newcastle United	1–2	Everton	Newcastle-upon-Tyne
	Elliott 37'		Husband 22', 49'	Stadium: St James' Park; Attendance: 37,094

20 September 1969 11	Ipswich Town	0–3	Everton	Ipswich
			Ball 45'; Royle 58'; Harvey 63'	Stadium: Portman Road; Attendance: 23,258

27 September 1969 12	Everton	4–2	Southampton	Liverpool
	Royle 12', 67' (pen.), 85'; Hurst 81'		Stokes 35'; Kemp 82'	Stadium: Goodison Park; Attendance: 46,942

4 October 1969 13	Wolverhampton Wanderers	2–3	Everton	Wolverhampton
	Curran 49', 67' (pen.)		Royle 16' (pen.); Morrissey 37'; Harvey 64'	Stadium: Molineux; Attendance: 40,838

8 October 1969 14	Crystal Palace	0–0	Everton	London
				Stadium: Selhurst Park; Attendance: 33,967

11 October 1969 15	Everton	3–1	Sunderland	Liverpool
	Morrissey 26'; Kendall 40'; Royle 75' (pen.)		Tueart 24'	Stadium: Goodison Park; Attendance: 47,271

18 October 1969 16	Everton	6–2	Stoke City	Liverpool
	Morrissey 11', 58'; Royle 17', 83' (pen.); Husband 73'; Ball 89'		Burrows 33'; Dobing 62'	Stadium: Goodison Park; Attendance: 48,663

25 October 1969 17	Coventry City	0–1	Everton	Coventry
			Royle 87'	Stadium: Highfield Road; Attendance: 37,816

1 November 1969 18	Everton	1–0	Nottingham Forest	Liverpool
	Wright 62'			Stadium: Goodison Park; Attendance: 49,610

8 November 1969 19	West Bromwich Albion	2–0	Everton	West Bromwich
	Astle 25'; Krzywicki 58'			Stadium: The Hawthorns; Attendance: 40,398

15 November 1969 20	Chelsea	1–1	Everton	London
	Osgood 11'		Husband 6'	Stadium: Stamford Bridge; Attendance: 49,895

22 November 1969 21	Everton	2–1	Burnley	Liverpool
	Hurst 13'; Royle 57'		Coates 43'	Stadium: Goodison Park; Attendance: 46,380

6 December 1969 22	Everton	0–3	Liverpool	Liverpool
			Hughes 48'; Brown 54' (o.g.); Graham 74'	Stadium: Goodison Park; Attendance: 57,370

13 December 1969 23	West Ham United	0–1	Everton	London
			Whittle 27'	Stadium: Upton Park; Attendance: 26,689

20 December 1969 24	Everton	1–0	Derby County	Liverpool
	Ball 87'			Stadium: Goodison Park; Attendance: 44,914

23 December 1969 25	Everton	1–0	Manchester City	Liverpool
	Whittle 78'			Stadium: Goodison Park; Attendance: 51,864

27 December 1969 26	Leeds United	2–1	Everton	Leeds
	Jones 16', 28'		Whittle 60'	Stadium: Elland Road; Attendance: 46,770

10 January 1970 27	Everton	3–0	Ipswich Town	Liverpool
	Kendall 11'; Royle 71', 82'			Stadium: Goodison Park; Attendance: 42,510

17 January 1970 28	Southampton	2–1	Everton	Southampton
	Channon 76', 88'		Morrissey 86'	Stadium: The Dell; Attendance: 27,156

24 January 1970 29	Everton	0–0	Newcastle United	Liverpool
				Stadium: Goodison Park; Attendance: 42,845

31 January 1970 30	Everton	1–0	Wolverhampton Wanderers	Liverpool
	Royle 32'			Stadium: Goodison Park; Attendance: 45,681

14 February 1970 31	Everton	2–2	Arsenal	Liverpool
	Whittle 9', 70'		George 2'; Radford 34'	Stadium: Goodison Park; Attendance: 48,564

21 February 1970 32	Everton	0–0	Coventry City	Liverpool
				Stadium: Goodison Park; Attendance: 45,934

28 February 1970 33	Nottingham Forest	1–1	Everton	Nottingham
	Ingram 18'		Royle 47'	Stadium: City Ground; Attendance: 29,174

7 March 1970 34	Burnley	1–2	Everton	Burnley
	Kindon 15'		Ball 14'; Hurst 40'	Stadium: Turf Moor; Attendance: 21,114

11 March 1970 35	Tottenham Hotspur	0–1	Everton	London
			Whittle 16'	Stadium: White Hart Lane; Attendance: 27,764

14 March 1970 36	Everton	3–2	Tottenham Hotspur	Liverpool
	Whittle 30'; Ball 40' (pen.); Royle 87'		Gilzean 33'; Bond 72' (pen.)	Stadium: Goodison Park; Attendance: 51,533

21 March 1970 37	Liverpool	0–2	Everton	Liverpool
			Royle 11'; Whittle 48'	Stadium: Anfield; Attendance: 54,496

28 March 1970 38	Everton	5–2	Chelsea	Liverpool
	Kendall 1'; Ball 4'; Royle 39', 47'; Whittle 57'		Dempsey 65'; Osgood 89'	Stadium: Goodison Park; Attendance: 58,337

30 March 1970 39	Stoke City	0–1	Everton	Stoke-on-Trent
			Whittle 8'	Stadium: Victoria Ground; Attendance: 33,111

1 April 1970 40	Everton	2–0	West Bromwich Albion	Liverpool
	Whittle 20'; Harvey 65'			Stadium: Goodison Park; Attendance: 58,523

4 April 1970 41	Sheffield Wednesday	0–1	Everton	Sheffield
			Morrissey 86'	Stadium: Hillsborough; Attendance: 30,690

8 April 1970 42	Sunderland	0–0	Everton	Sunderland
				Stadium: Roker Park; Attendance: 28,774

=== League Cup ===
3 September 1969 2nd Round	Darlington	0–1	Everton	Darlington
			Ball 59'	Stadium: Feethams; Attendance: 13,860

24 September 1969 3rd Round	Arsenal	0–0	Everton	London
				Stadium: Highbury; Attendance: 36,119

30 September 1969 3rd Round Replay	Everton	1–0	Arsenal	Liverpool
	Kendall 48'			Stadium: Goodison Park; Attendance: 41,140

14 October 1969 4th Round	Manchester City	2–0	Everton	Manchester
	Bell 7'; Lee 43' (pen.)			Stadium: Maine Road; Attendance: 45,643

=== FA Cup ===
3 January 1970 3rdRound	Sheffield United	2–1	Everton	Sheffield
	Reece 48'; Addison 80'		Ball 15' (pen.)	Stadium: Bramall Lane; Attendance: 29,116
