= Gordon West =

English footballer

Personal information
- Full name: Gordon West
- Date of birth: 24 April 1943
- Place of birth: Darfield, West Riding of Yorkshire, England
- Date of death: 10 June 2012 (aged 69)
- Place of death: Brighton-le-Sands, Merseyside, England
- Height: 1.85 m (6 ft 1 in)
- Position: Goalkeeper

Senior career*
Years	Team	Apps	(Gls)
1960–1962	Blackpool	33	(0)
1962–1973	Everton	402	(0)
1976–1979	Tranmere Rovers	17	(0)
Total		452	(0)

International career
1968–1969	England	3	(0)
- * Club domestic league appearances and goals

Gordon West (24 April 1943 – 10 June 2012) was an English professional football goalkeeper. He won three international caps in a career that included a long stint at Everton.

== Club career ==
=== Blackpool ===
West played as a defender for Barnsley, Don and Dearne Boys, but when accompanying a friend to a trial with Blackpool decided to try out as a goalkeeper. The Lancashire club signed him, and West made his debut for Blackpool at the age of 17. After 33 League games for the Tangerines, he signed for Everton in March 1962 for £27,000, then a British record for a goalkeeper, replacing Albert Dunlop.

=== Everton ===
In his first full season on Merseyside, West won the 1962–63 Football League First Division with Everton. He became the club's first-choice goalkeeper for more than ten years, forming a partnership with central defender and captain, Brian Labone. In that period he won the FA Cup in 1966 and was a runner-up in 1968. In 1969–70 Everton won the league again, with West keeping 21 clean sheets, still a club record. He made 399 appearances for the Toffees and retired in 1973.

=== Tranmere Rovers ===
West came out of retirement after three years to play briefly for cross-Mersey rivals Tranmere Rovers. He made seventeen League appearances for the Wirral club.

== Career statistics ==
Appearances and goals by club, season and competition
Club	Season	League			FA Cup		League Cup		Europe		FA Charity Shield		Total	
Club	Season	Division	Apps	Goals	Apps	Goals	Apps	Goals	Apps	Goals	Apps	Goals	Apps	Goals
Blackpool	1960–61	First Division	18	0	1	0	0	0	0	0	0	0	19	0
Blackpool	1961–62	First Division	12	0	2	0	0	0	0	0	0	0	14	0
Blackpool	Total		30	0	3	0	!0	0	0	0	0	0	33	0
Everton	1961–62	First Division	16	0	1	0	0	0	0	0	0	0	17	0
Everton	1962–63	First Division	38	0	3	0	0	0	2	0	0	0	43	0
Everton	1963–64	First Division	22	0	3	0	0	0	2	0	1	0	28	0
Everton	1964–65	First Division	20	0	4	0	0	0	2	0	0	0	26	0
Everton	1965–66	First Division	24	0	8	0	0	0	2	0	0	0	34	0
Everton	1966–67	First Division	36	0	5	0	0	0	4	0	1	0	46	0
Everton	1967–68	First Division	41	0	6	0	2	0	0	0	0	0	49	0
Everton	1968–69	First Division	42	0	5	0	4	0	0	0	0	0	51	0
Everton	1969–70	First Division	42	0	1	0	4	0	0	0	0	0	47	0
Everton	1970–71	First Division	12	0	1	0	0	0	1	0	1	0	15	0
Everton	1971–72	First Division	42	0	4	0	1	0	0	0	0	0	47	0
Everton	1972–73	First Division	4	0	0	0	0	0	0	0	0	0	4	0
Everton	Total		335	0	40	0	11	0	13	0	3	0	402	0
Tranmere Rovers	1976-77	Third Division	11	0	0	0	0	0	0	0	0	0	11	0
Tranmere Rovers	1977–78	Third Division	1	0	0	0	0	0	0	0	0	0	1	0
Tranmere Rovers	1977–78	Third Division	5	0	0	0	0	0	0	0	0	0	5	0
Tranmere Rovers	Total		17	0	0	0	0	0	0	0	0	0	17	0
Career total			382	0	43	0	11	0	13	0	3	0	452	0

== International career ==
West won three caps for England. He turned down a place in the 1970 FIFA World Cup squad because he wanted to stay at home with his family.

== Life after football ==
After giving up football, West worked in security at RAF Woodvale and became an after dinner speaker. Former Everton and Wales goalkeeper Neville Southall campaigned for West to be rewarded with a testimonial game by Everton for his eleven years of service. West lived in Brighton-le-Sands, Merseyside. On 10 June 2012, West died of cancer in hospital.

His funeral was attended by Martin Buchan, Colin Harvey, Dave Hickson, John Hurst, Cliff Marshall, Peter Reid, George Telfer, Derek Temple, Tommy Wright and former player and manager Joe Royle, along with former chairman Sir Philip Carter, who paid tribute at the service.

== Honours ==
Everton

- Football League First Division: 1962–63, 1969–70
- FA Cup: 1965–66; runner-up: 1967–68
- FA Charity Shield: 1963, 1970
