= John Hurst (footballer) =

English footballer (1947–2024)

Personal information
- Date of birth: 6 February 1947
- Place of birth: Blackpool, Lancashire, England
- Date of death: 18 January 2024 (aged 76)
- Position: Wing half

Youth career
- Everton

Senior career*
Years	Team	Apps	(Gls)
1964–1976	Everton	349	(29)
1976–1981	Oldham Athletic	170	(2)
Total		519	(31)

International career
1967–1969	England U23	9	(1)
- * Club domestic league appearances and goals

John Hurst (6 February 1947 – 18 January 2024) was an English professional footballer. Born in Blackpool, Lancashire, Hurst joined the youth system for Everton, making his first team debut in the 1965–66 season. Originally a striker, Everton manager Harry Catterick made Hurst into a centre-half, a position in which he appeared in the 1968 FA Cup Final. He formed a defensive partnership with Brian Labone, the club captain of Everton at the time. Following the introduction of substitutes to English football in 1965 (for injury only) Hurst became Everton's first ever substitute replacing Fred Pickering at Stoke City's Victoria Ground in August 1965. Everton won the league title in the 1969–70 season and Hurst was an ever-present during this campaign, making 42 appearances and contributing 5 goals. He also won the 1970 FA Charity Shield with Everton. Hurst was transferred to Oldham Athletic following the 1975–76 season.

After his playing career Hurst remained in the game, working as a coach at Everton, and as a scout for Manchester City, then managed by his former teammate, Joe Royle.

Hurst died on 18 January 2024, at the age of 76.

== Honours ==
Everton

- FA Cup runner-up: 1967–68

== Sources ==
- John Hurst at Everton Stats
