= 1970 FA Charity Shield =

- Event: FA Charity Shield
Chelsea	Everton
1	2
- Date: 8 August 1970
- Venue: Stamford Bridge, London
- Referee: David Smith
- Attendance: 43,547

The 1970 FA Charity Shield was the 48th FA Charity Shield, the annual football match played between the winners of the previous season's Football League and FA Cup competitions. It was contested between Everton, the reigning First Division champions, and Chelsea, holders of the FA Cup. Goals from Alan Whittle and Howard Kendall gave Everton a 2–1 victory; Chelsea's goal was scored by Ian Hutchinson. The match was staged at Stamford Bridge, Chelsea's home ground.

== Match details ==
8 August 1970

Chelsea	1–2	Everton
Hutchinson 78'		Whittle 37'; Kendall 54'

Stamford Bridge, London
Attendance: 43,547

Chelsea	Everton

GK	1	(England) Peter Bonetti
RB	2	(England) David Webb
LB	3	(England) Ron Harris (c)
CM	4	(England) John Hollins
CB	5	(Republic of Ireland) Paddy Mulligan
CB	6	(England) Marvin Hinton
RM	7	(England) Keith Weller
CM	8	(England) Alan Hudson
CF	9	(England) Peter Osgood
CF	10	(England) Ian Hutchinson
LM	11	(England) Peter Houseman
Manager:
(England) Dave Sexton

GK	1	(England) Gordon West
RB	2	(England) Tommy Wright
LB	3	(England) Keith Newton
CM	4	(England) Howard Kendall
CB	5	(England) Brian Labone (c)
CM	6	(England) Colin Harvey
RM	7	(England) Jimmy Husband
CM	8	(England) Alan Ball
CF	9	(England) Joe Royle
CB	10	(England) John Hurst
LM	11	(England) Alan Whittle
Manager:
(England) Harry Catterick

Match rules

- 90 minutes.
- Title shared if scores level.

== See also ==
- 1970–71 in English football
- 1970–71 FA Cup
