= Gerry Humphreys (footballer) =

Welsh footballer

Personal information
- Full name: Gerald Humphreys
- Date of birth: 14 January 1946 (age 80)
- Place of birth: Llandudno, Wales
- Height: 5 ft 8 in (1.73 m)
- Position: Winger

Youth career
- ?–1965: Everton

Senior career*
Years	Team	Apps	(Gls)
1965–1970	Everton	12	(2)
1970–1971	Crystal Palace	11	(0)
1971–1977	Crewe Alexandra	193	(30)
1977–?	Rhyl		
Total		216	(32)
- * Club domestic league appearances and goals

Gerald Humphreys (born 14 January 1946) is a Welsh, retired professional footballer who played as a winger. He made a total of 216 Football League appearances for Everton, Crystal Palace and Crewe Alexandra scoring 32 times.

== Playing career ==
Humphreys began his playing career as an apprentice at Everton and went on to make 12 senior appearances for the club between 1965 and 1970, scoring twice. On 8 June 1970, he signed for Crystal Palace and made 11 appearances in the 1970–1971 season, mainly as a substitute, but without scoring. In January 1971, Humphreys moved on to Crewe Alexandra where he made 193 appearances (scoring 30 goals) before moving into non-league football with Rhyl in 1977.
