= 1970–71 Newport County A.F.C. season =

Welsh association football club season

Newport County
1970–71 season
- Manager: Bobby Ferguson (until 21 Nov 1970); Billy Lucas (after 21 Nov 1970)
- Stadium: Somerton Park
- Fourth Division: 22nd (re-elected)
- FA Cup: First round
- League Cup: Second round
- Welsh Cup: Fifth round
- Top goalscorer: League: Brown (14); All: Brown (16)
- Highest home attendance: 4,515 vs Northampton Town (15 August 1970)
- Lowest home attendance: 1,479 vs Stockport County (2 March 1971)
- Average home league attendance: 2,564
Home colours	Away colours

The 1970–71 season was Newport County's ninth consecutive season in the Football League Fourth Division since relegation at the end of the 1961–62 season and their 43rd overall in the Football League. The season saw the worst set of results in County's history, with the club failing to win any of the first 25 league matches, setting a Football League record.

The season started with a home and away loss, but County were still two places from the foot of the table. However their record of three wins and five draws from the next 31 games left them rooted to the bottom. Results improved in the latter stages of the season, with County picking up seven wins and three draws in the remaining 13 games. The club still had to apply for re-election for the third successive season, but held on to their League status.

== Season review ==
=== Results summary ===
Overall								Home						Away					
Pld	W	D	L	GF	GA	GAv	Pts	W	D	L	GF	GA	Pts	W	D	L	GF	GA	Pts
46	10	8	28	55	85	0.647	28	8	3	12	32	36	19	2	5	16	23	49	9

Source: rsssf.com

=== Results by round ===
Round	1	2	3	4	5	6	7	8	9	10	11	12	13	14	15	16	17	18	19	20	21	22	23	24	25	26	27	28	29	30	31	32	33	34	35	36	37	38	39	40	41	42	43	44	45	46
Ground	H	A	H	H	A	H	A	A	H	H	A	H	A	A	H	A	H	H	A	A	H	A	H	A	A	H	A	A	H	A	H	H	A	H	H	A	A	H	A	H	H	A	H	H	A	A
Result	L	L	L	L	L	L	L	L	L	L	D	L	L	L	D	L	L	L	L	L	L	L	D	L	D	W	L	D	W	L	L	W	L	W	W	D	W	W	D	L	W	W	D	W	L	L
Position	22	22	24	24	24	24	24	24	24	24	24	24	24	24	24	24	24	24	24	24	24	24	24	24	24	24	24	24	24	24	24	24	24	23	23	23	23	23	23	23	23	23	23	22	22	22

Updated to match(es) played on 1 May 1971. Source: statto.com
A = Away; H = Home; W = Win; D = Draw; L = Loss

== Fixtures and results ==
=== Fourth Division ===
Date	Opponents	Venue	Result	Scorers	Attendance
15 Aug 1970	Northampton Town	H	0–1		4,515
21 Aug 1970	Southport	A	1–6	Brown	2,905
29 Aug 1970	Bournemouth & Boscombe Athletic	H	0–2		3,079
1 Sep 1970	Grimsby Town	H	0–1		2,569
5 Sep 1970	Peterborough United	A	1–2	Jones	4,647
12 Sep 1970	Oldham Athletic	H	1–4	Thomas	1,849
19 Sep 1970	Darlington	A	1–2	Jones	3,309
23 Sep 1970	Notts County	A	0–2		8,445
26 Sep 1970	Chester	H	0–1		1,827
29 Sep 1970	Exeter City	H	0–1		2,169
3 Oct 1970	Hartlepool	A	2–2	Hooper 2	3,238
10 Oct 1970	Scunthorpe United	H	2–3	Brown 2	3,539
17 Oct 1970	Northampton Town	A	0–1		6,171
21 Oct 1970	Southend United	A	0–3		4,349
24 Oct 1970	Workington	H	2–2	D.H.Harris, Brown	2,559
30 Oct 1970	York City	A	0–1		3,120
7 Nov 1970	Brentford	H	0–1		2,407
10 Nov 1970	Colchester United	H	1–3	Jones	1,973
14 Nov 1970	Cambridge United	A	2–3	Jones, Radford	3,608
27 Nov 1970	Stockport County	A	2–3	Radford	3,752
5 Dec 1970	Aldershot	H	1–2	Brown	2,629
12 Dec 1970	Oldham Athletic	A	0–4		7,845
19 Dec 1970	Southport	H	2–2	Hooper, D.H.Harris	2,805
26 Dec 1970	Crewe Alexandra	A	0–2		3,058
9 Jan 1971	Exeter City	A	1–1	Jones	4,142
15 Jan 1971	Southend United	H	3–0	Jones, Brown, White	2,308
23 Jan 1971	Barrow	A	1–3	White	2,075
6 Feb 1971	Aldershot	A	1–1	Wood	5,686
12 Feb 1971	Barrow	H	3–2	Jones, Coldrick, White	1,542
20 Feb 1971	Colchester United	A	2–4	Young, Brown	6,444
26 Feb 1971	York City	H	0–3		1,753
2 Mar 1971	Stockport County	H	3–1	Jones 2, Thomas	1,479
6 Mar 1971	Workington	A	1–2	Thomas	1,748
9 Mar 1971	Notts County	H	2–1	Smith, Brown	2,129
12 Mar 1971	Cambridge United	H	2–0	Smith 2	2,587
17 Mar 1971	Lincoln City	A	1–1	Thomas	4,407
20 Mar 1971	Brentford	A	3–0	Thomas 2, OG (Nelmes)	8,402
27 Mar 1971	Peterborough United	H	2–0	Hooper, Brown	2,588
3 Apr 1971	Bournemouth & Boscombe Athletic	A	2–2	Thomas, Hooper	8,295
10 Apr 1971	Crewe Alexandra	H	1–3	Thomas	3,353
13 Apr 1971	Hartlepool	H	2–0	Radford, Thomas	3,173
17 Apr 1971	Scunthorpe United	A	1–0	Brown	3,075
20 Apr 1971	Lincoln City	H	2–2	Brown, Coldrick	3,397
24 Apr 1971	Darlington	H	3–1	Brown 3	2,756
27 Apr 1971	Grimsby Town	A	0–2		4,710
1 May 1971	Chester	A	1–2	Aizlewood	2,645

=== FA Cup ===
Round	Date	Opponents	Venue	Result	Scorers	Attendance
1	21 Nov 1970	Barnet	A	1–6	Jones	2,994

=== League Cup ===
Round	Date	Opponents	Venue	Result	Scorers	Attendance
1	19 Aug 1970	Reading	H	2–1	Brown, Young	3,624
2	9 Sep 1970	Blackpool	A	1–4	Brown	9,828

=== Welsh Cup ===
Round	Date	Opponents	Venue	Result	Scorers	Attendance
5	2 Mar 1971	Cardiff City	H	1–1	Thomas	6,162
5r	10 Mar 1971	Cardiff City	A	0–4		10,385

== League table ==
Pos	Team	Pld	W	D	L	GF	GA	GAv	Pts	Promotion or relegation
20	Cambridge United	46	15	13	18	51	66	0.773	43	
21	Lincoln City	46	13	13	20	70	71	0.986	39	Re-elected
22	Newport County	46	10	8	28	55	85	0.647	28	Re-elected
23	Hartlepool	46	8	12	26	34	74	0.459	28	Re-elected
24	Barrow	46	7	8	31	51	90	0.567	22	Re-elected

Source: rsssf.com

=== Election ===
Votes	Club	Fate
47	Lincoln City	Re-elected to the League
38	Barrow	Re-elected to the League
33	Hartlepool	Re-elected to the League
33	Newport County	Re-elected to the League
22	Hereford United	Not elected to the League
14	Wigan Athletic	Not elected to the League
2	Cambridge City	Not elected to the League
2	Telford United	Not elected to the League
2	Yeovil Town	Not elected to the League
1	Boston United	Not elected to the League
1	Bradford Park Avenue	Not elected to the League
1	Romford	Not elected to the League
0	Bedford Town	Not elected to the League
0	Chelmsford City	Not elected to the League
0	Gateshead	Not elected to the League
0	Hillingdon Borough	Not elected to the League
0	Kettering Town	Not elected to the League
