= Ted Sagar =

English footballer (1910–1986)

Personal information
- Full name: Edward Sagar
- Date of birth: 7 February 1910
- Place of birth: Moorends, Thorne, England
- Date of death: 16 October 1986 (aged 76)
- Height: 5 ft 10 in (1.78 m)
- Position: Goalkeeper

Senior career*
Years	Team	Apps	(Gls)
1929–1953	Everton	463	(0)
1941	→ Portadown (guest)	0	(0)

International career
1935–1936	England	4	(0)
1933–1936	Football League XI	5	(0)
1941	Northern Ireland Regional League XI	1	(0)
- * Club domestic league appearances and goals

Edward Sagar (7 February 1910 – 16 October 1986) was an English footballer who played for Everton and England.

He was a goalkeeper who joined Everton as an apprentice in 1929 after playing for Thorne Colliery in Yorkshire and made his debut in 1930. He played in the championship winning sides of 1931–32 and 1938–39 and the FA Cup winning side of 1933.

He made 499 appearances for Everton; this goalkeeping record for the club was only beaten by Neville Southall in 1994.

He retired from playing in 1952 and ran a pub in Aintree. He died in October 1986, aged 76. Sagar played four times for England, as well as once for Northern Ireland Regional League during the war.

== Honours ==
Everton

- FA Cup: 1932–33
