= 1970–71 in English football =

Football in England
- Season: 1970–71

Men's football
- First Division: Arsenal
- Second Division: Leicester City
- Third Division: Preston North End
- Fourth Division: Notts County
- FA Cup: Arsenal
- League Cup: Tottenham Hotspur
- Charity Shield: Everton

The 1970–71 season was the 91st season of competitive football in England.

== Honours ==
Competition	Winner	Runner-up
First Division	Arsenal (8*)	Leeds United
Second Division	Leicester City	Sheffield United
Third Division	Preston North End	Fulham
Fourth Division	Notts County	Bournemouth & Boscombe Athletic
FA Cup Final	Arsenal (4)	Liverpool
League Cup	Tottenham Hotspur (1)	Aston Villa
Charity Shield	Everton	Chelsea
Home Championship	England	Northern Ireland

Notes = Number in parentheses is the times that club has won that honour. * indicates new record for competition

== FA Cup ==
The 1971 FA Cup Final saw Arsenal beat Liverpool 2–1 to become only the fourth club in history and the second club this century to have won the league championship and FA Cup double.

Stoke City beat Everton 3–2 at Selhurst Park in a third-place playoff, held the day before the final. The biggest FA Cup shock, however, was Fourth Division Colchester United's 3–2 victory over Don Revie's Leeds United at Layer Road in the fifth round.

Barnet equalled the record for the biggest win by a non-league team over a Football League team by beating Newport County 6–1 in the First Round.

== League Cup ==
The final was held at Wembley Stadium, London. Tottenham Hotspur beat Aston Villa to win the 1971 Football League Cup Final and add to their list of trophies won under the management of Bill Nicholson.

== Football League ==
=== First Division ===
Arsenal won the league championship at the end of a season which would soon be followed by their FA Cup final tie with Liverpool. Arsenal secured the league title at White Hart Lane, the home of their bitter rivals Tottenham Hotspur. They narrowly overcame Leeds United to win the league, with a 12-point gap separating Leeds from third-placed Tottenham. Wolverhampton Wanderers and Southampton joined these two teams in the UEFA Cup. Chelsea missed out on the top five on goal average but compensated by achieving European Cup Winners' Cup glory over Real Madrid. Liverpool also qualified for the Cup Winners' Cup as the losing FA Cup finalists.

Burnley and Blackpool (who won this year's Anglo-Italian Cup) were relegated to the Second Division. Burnley returned from 1973–74 to 1975–76 but Blackpool had to wait 39 years to regain their top flight status.

Wilf McGuinness was sacked at the end of 1970 after 18 unsuccessful months as manager of Manchester United. Sir Matt Busby was re-appointed as manager on a temporary basis, but never considered returning to his old job on a permanent basis. Leicester City manager Frank O'Farrell was appointed at the end of the season, ahead of candidates including Jock Stein and Don Revie.

Pos	Team	Pld	W	D	L	GF	GA	GAv	Pts	Qualification or relegation
1	Arsenal (C)	42	29	7	6	71	29	2.448	65	Qualification for the European Cup first round
2	Leeds United	42	27	10	5	72	30	2.400	64	Qualification for the UEFA Cup first round
3	Tottenham Hotspur	42	19	14	9	54	33	1.636	52	Qualification for the UEFA Cup first round
4	Wolverhampton Wanderers	42	22	8	12	64	54	1.185	52	Qualification for the UEFA Cup first round
5	Liverpool	42	17	17	8	42	24	1.750	51	Qualification for the European Cup Winners' Cup first round (Note: Liverpool qualified for the European Cup Winners' Cup as FA Cup runners-up, as winners, Arsenal, qualified for the European Cup.)
6	Chelsea	42	18	15	9	52	42	1.238	51	Qualification for the European Cup Winners' Cup first round (Note: Chelsea qualified for the European Cup Winners' Cup as the 1970-71 European Cup Winners' Cup winners.)
7	Southampton	42	17	12	13	56	44	1.273	46	Qualification for the UEFA Cup first round
8	Manchester United	42	16	11	15	65	66	0.985	43	Qualification for the Watney Cup (Note: Manchester United and West Bromwich Albion qualified for the Watney Cup as the two teams with the most goals that hadn't already qualified for a European competition.)
9	Derby County	42	16	10	16	56	54	1.037	42	
10	Coventry City	42	16	10	16	37	38	0.974	42	
11	Manchester City	42	12	17	13	47	42	1.119	41	
12	Newcastle United	42	14	13	15	44	46	0.957	41	
13	Stoke City	42	12	13	17	44	48	0.917	37	
14	Everton	42	12	13	17	54	60	0.900	37	
15	Huddersfield Town	42	11	14	17	40	49	0.816	36	
16	Nottingham Forest	42	14	8	20	42	61	0.689	36	
17	West Bromwich Albion	42	10	15	17	58	75	0.773	35	Qualification for the Watney Cup
18	Crystal Palace	42	12	11	19	39	57	0.684	35	
19	Ipswich Town	42	12	10	20	42	48	0.875	34	
20	West Ham United	42	10	14	18	47	60	0.783	34	
21	Burnley (R)	42	7	13	22	29	63	0.460	27	Relegation to the Second Division
22	Blackpool (R)	42	4	15	23	34	66	0.515	23	Relegation to the Second Division

Source: World Football
Rules for classification: 1) Points; 2) Goal average; 3) Goals scored
(C) Champions; (R) Relegated

=== Second Division ===
Leicester City and Sheffield United were promoted to the First Division. Blackburn Rovers and Bolton Wanderers, two of the most famous and historic names in English football, were relegated to the Third Division.

Pos	Team	Pld	W	D	L	GF	GA	GAv	Pts	Qualification or relegation
1	Leicester City (C, P)	42	23	13	6	57	30	1.900	59	Promotion to the First Division
2	Sheffield United (P)	42	21	14	7	73	39	1.872	56	Promotion to the First Division
3	Cardiff City	42	20	13	9	64	41	1.561	53	Qualification for the Cup Winners' Cup first round
4	Carlisle United	42	20	13	9	65	43	1.512	53	Qualification for the Watney Cup
5	Hull City	42	19	13	10	54	41	1.317	51	
6	Luton Town	42	18	13	11	62	43	1.442	49	Qualification for the Watney Cup
7	Middlesbrough	42	17	14	11	60	43	1.395	48	
8	Millwall	42	19	9	14	59	42	1.405	47	
9	Birmingham City	42	17	12	13	58	48	1.208	46	
10	Norwich City	42	15	14	13	54	52	1.038	44	
11	Queens Park Rangers	42	16	11	15	58	53	1.094	43	
12	Swindon Town	42	15	12	15	61	51	1.196	42	
13	Sunderland	42	15	12	15	52	54	0.963	42	
14	Oxford United	42	14	14	14	41	48	0.854	42	
15	Sheffield Wednesday	42	12	12	18	51	69	0.739	36	
16	Portsmouth	42	10	14	18	46	61	0.754	34	
17	Orient	42	9	16	17	29	51	0.569	34	
18	Watford	42	10	13	19	38	60	0.633	33	
19	Bristol City	42	10	11	21	46	64	0.719	31	
20	Charlton Athletic	42	8	14	20	41	65	0.631	30	
21	Blackburn Rovers (R)	42	6	15	21	37	69	0.536	27	Relegation to the Third Division
22	Bolton Wanderers (R)	42	7	10	25	35	74	0.473	24	Relegation to the Third Division

Rules for classification: 1) Points; 2) Goal average; 3) Goals scored
(C) Champions; (P) Promoted; (R) Relegated

=== Third Division ===
Preston North End and Fulham finally had something to shout about by getting promoted to the Second Division. Reading, Bury, Doncaster Rovers and Gillingham slid into the Fourth Division.

Pos	Team	Pld	W	D	L	GF	GA	GAv	Pts	Qualification or relegation
1	Preston North End (C, P)	46	22	17	7	63	39	1.615	61	Promotion to the Second Division
2	Fulham (P)	46	24	12	10	68	41	1.659	60	Promotion to the Second Division
3	Halifax Town	46	22	12	12	74	55	1.345	56	Qualification for the Watney Cup
4	Aston Villa	46	19	15	12	54	46	1.174	53	
5	Chesterfield	46	17	17	12	66	38	1.737	51	
6	Bristol Rovers	46	19	13	14	69	50	1.380	51	
7	Mansfield Town	46	18	15	13	64	62	1.032	51	
8	Rotherham United	46	17	16	13	64	60	1.067	50	
9	Wrexham	46	18	13	15	72	65	1.108	49	Qualification for the Watney Cup
10	Torquay United	46	19	11	16	54	57	0.947	49	
11	Swansea City	46	15	16	15	59	56	1.054	46	
12	Barnsley	46	17	11	18	49	52	0.942	45	
13	Shrewsbury Town	46	16	13	17	58	62	0.935	45	
14	Brighton & Hove Albion	46	14	16	16	50	47	1.064	44	
15	Plymouth Argyle	46	12	19	15	63	63	1.000	43	
16	Rochdale	46	14	15	17	61	68	0.897	43	
17	Port Vale	46	15	12	19	52	59	0.881	42	
18	Tranmere Rovers	46	10	22	14	45	55	0.818	42	
19	Bradford City	46	13	14	19	49	62	0.790	40	
20	Walsall	46	14	11	21	51	57	0.895	39	
21	Reading (R)	46	14	11	21	48	85	0.565	39	Relegation to the Fourth Division
22	Bury (R)	46	12	13	21	52	60	0.867	37	Relegation to the Fourth Division
23	Doncaster Rovers (R)	46	13	9	24	45	66	0.682	35	Relegation to the Fourth Division
24	Gillingham (R)	46	10	13	23	42	67	0.627	33	Relegation to the Fourth Division

Rules for classification: 1) Points; 2) Goal average; 3) Goals scored
(C) Champions; (P) Promoted; (R) Relegated

=== Fourth Division ===
Notts County, Bournemouth & Boscombe Athletic, Oldham Athletic and York City were promoted to the Third Division. Newport County set a new Football League record by not winning any of their first 25 matches. The Football League voted for the league's four bottom clubs to maintain their status.

Pos	Team	Pld	W	D	L	GF	GA	GAv	Pts	Promotion or relegation
1	Notts County (C, P)	46	30	9	7	89	36	2.472	69	Promotion to the Third Division
2	Bournemouth & Boscombe Athletic (P)	46	24	12	10	81	46	1.761	60	Promotion to the Third Division
3	Oldham Athletic (P)	46	24	11	11	88	63	1.397	59	Promotion to the Third Division
4	York City (P)	46	23	10	13	78	54	1.444	56	Promotion to the Third Division
5	Chester	46	24	7	15	69	55	1.255	55	
6	Colchester United	46	21	12	13	70	54	1.296	54	Qualified for the Watney Cup (Note: The two teams who scored the most goals in each division, and did not qualify for Europe and were not promoted, qualified for the Watney Cup.)
7	Northampton Town	46	19	13	14	63	59	1.068	51	
8	Southport	46	21	6	19	63	57	1.105	48	
9	Exeter City	46	17	14	15	67	68	0.985	48	
10	Workington	46	18	12	16	48	49	0.980	48	
11	Stockport County	46	16	14	16	49	65	0.754	46	
12	Darlington	46	17	11	18	58	57	1.018	45	
13	Aldershot	46	14	17	15	66	71	0.930	45	
14	Brentford	46	18	8	20	66	62	1.065	44	
15	Crewe Alexandra	46	18	8	20	75	76	0.987	44	Qualified for the Watney Cup
16	Peterborough United	46	18	7	21	70	71	0.986	43	
17	Scunthorpe United	46	15	13	18	56	61	0.918	43	
18	Southend United	46	14	15	17	53	66	0.803	43	
19	Grimsby Town	46	18	7	21	57	71	0.803	43	
20	Cambridge United	46	15	13	18	51	66	0.773	43	
21	Lincoln City	46	13	13	20	70	71	0.986	39	Re-elected
22	Newport County	46	10	8	28	55	85	0.647	28	Re-elected
23	Hartlepool	46	8	12	26	34	74	0.459	28	Re-elected
24	Barrow	46	7	8	31	51	90	0.567	22	Re-elected

Source: rsssf.com
(C) Champions; (P) Promoted

=== Top goalscorers ===
First Division

- Tony Brown (West Bromwich Albion) – 28 goals

Second Division

- John Hickton (Middlesbrough) – 25 goals

Third Division

- Gerry Ingram (Preston North End) and Dudley Roberts (Mansfield Town) – 22 goals

Fourth Division

- Ted MacDougall (Bournemouth & Boscombe Athletic) – 42 goals

== European football ==
Leeds United won the Inter-Cities Fairs Cup against Juventus in the two leg Final and also took part in the Inter-Cities Fairs Cup Trophy Play-Off which they lost 2–1 to Barcelona.

There was also success in London for Chelsea, who beat Real Madrid in the European Cup Winners Cup final to win their first ever European trophy.

== Deaths ==
- 5 June 1971 – Kevin Baron, 44, former Liverpool forward who collected a runners-up medal in the 1950 FA Cup Final.

== Ford Sporting League ==
The Ford Sporting League was a short-lived reward scheme sponsored by the Ford Motor Company. Its only season was that of 1970–71. Clubs were awarded a point for every goal scored at home and two points for every goal scored away, but lost 5 points if a player was booked and 10 points if a player was sent off.

Points could be earned over the first 42 league games (it did not apply to cup ties) only, so that the First and Second divisions were on an equal footing with the Third and Fourth.

Oldham Athletic won the competition, winning a pot of £70,000. League rules stipulated the prize money be used on stadium improvements, so the money went to build a stand in the stadium.

The £70,000 prize fund was made up of 8 monthly prizes of £2,500 and then a final prize of £50,000. The points total was cumulative, which resulted in Oldham winning each prize available, as they picked up only four bookings and no red cards over the 42 game period.

Ford's sponsorship of the competition is notable, with the 1970–71 season marking a watershed for sponsorship in English football. In addition to the Ford Sporting League, the season saw the first Watney Cup and first Texaco Cup, although The Football League itself turned down an offer of £600,000 to sponsor the Football League Cup.

== Star players ==
Frank McLintock was credited for his key role in Arsenal's double triumph with the FWA Footballer of the Year award.

== Star managers ==
- Bertie Mee firmly re-established Arsenal as one of England's top clubs by guiding them to the double.
- Dave Sexton guided Chelsea to Cup Winners' Cup glory over Real Madrid to bring the Londoners their first ever European trophy.
- Bill Nicholson added a League Cup triumph to his long list of honours at Tottenham.

== Events of the season ==
- 15 August 1970 – The Football League season begins.
- 31 August 1970: The first month of the First Division campaign ends with Leeds United, champions two seasons ago, top of the league, having won their first five matches. Manchester City are second, with Liverpool, Derby County, Nottingham Forest and Chelsea just behind them and level on points. Wolverhampton Wanderers, Burnley and Ipswich Town are level on points at the bottom of the division.
- 26 September 1970: Arsenal slip to fourth place in the First Division after they are thrashed 5–0 by Stoke City.
- 30 September 1970: September ends with Leeds United still top of the First Division, two points ahead of their nearest rivals Manchester City. The challenge at the top remains a close one, with Tottenham Hotspur, Arsenal and Chelsea all level on points. Burnley are bottom of the table with no wins from their opening ten games.
- 31 October 1970: Leeds United remain top of the First Division as October draws to a close, with Arsenal – two points behind them – now their closest challengers, as Manchester City have slipped to fourth place and the third place is now occupied by Tottenham Hotspur. Crystal Palace, in only their second season in the top flight, are sixth in the league and emerging as surprise outsiders for a possible title challenge. Blackpool and Burnley continue to prop up the rest of the First Division.
- 30 November 1970: November ends with Leeds United still First Division leaders. They now have a four-point lead over Arsenal. Blackpool and Burnley continue their barren run and are still occupying the relegation places.
- 26 December 1970: A thrilling league game at the Baseball Ground sees Derby County and Manchester United fight out a thrilling 4–4 draw. Derby occupy 17th place in the First Division in their second season since promotion, while United stand 18th just over two years after European Cup glory and just over three years since their last league title win. Blackpool and Burnley's dismal form has yet to improve and they still occupy the two relegation places. At the top end of the table, Leeds United remain top, three points ahead of Arsenal.
- 29 December 1970: Wilf McGuinness is sacked after 18 months as manager of Manchester United. Legendary former manager and current director Sir Matt Busby is placed in charge of the first team until the end of the season.
- 2 January 1971: Ten ties fall victim to the cold weather on FA Cup third round day. On the upset front, York City of the Fourth Division topple second-tier Bolton Wanderers while West Bromwich Albion of the top flight fail to beat Division Four club Scunthorpe United at home. In an all-Welsh clash, Swansea City beat Rhyl 6–1, and Jimmy Husband marks his return to the Everton ranks after an injury-enforced absence with a brace in his club's 2–0 win against Blackburn Rovers. In the capital, Crystal Palace and Chelsea draw while Wolverhampton Wanderers' four goals in the second half help them defeat Norwich City 5–1.
- 31 January 1971: Leeds United now have a five-point lead over Arsenal, who have a game in hand, at the top of the First Division. The challenge from Tottenham Hotspur, Chelsea and Wolverhampton Wanderers is becoming increasingly distant, while Manchester City's title hopes are fading even quicker as they now occupy seventh place. Last season's champions Everton stand 13th, level on points with Manchester United, with Blackpool and Burnley still unable to form a good run and climb out of the relegation zone.
- 27 February 1971: Tottenham Hotspur beat Aston Villa 2–0 in the Football League Cup final. In the league, Leeds United now have a seven-point lead over Arsenal, although the North Londoners have two games in hand. Manchester City have fallen away to eighth place, while Manchester United are enjoying something of a resurgence under the temporary leadership of Sir Matt Busby and have climbed from 18th place to 11th in the last two months. However, Burnley and Blackpool both remain in the relegation zone as their dismal form has continued.
- 31 March 1971: With the league season now in its final quarter, Leeds United are six points ahead of Arsenal at the top of the First Division table, but Arsenal have three games in hand. At the bottom end of the table, Burnley and Blackpool's dismal season continues to show no sign of improvement as they still occupy the drop zone.
- 17 April 1971: Arsenal overhaul Leeds United at the top of the First Division as they beat Newcastle United 1–0 and Leeds are controversially beaten 2–1 at home by struggling West Bromwich Albion. Arsenal and Leeds are now level on points, but the Gunners have a superior goal average and two games in hand.
- 24 April 1971: Arsenal are held to a 2–2 draw by West Bromwich Albion, but are a point ahead of Leeds United, with the Gunners having three games remaining and the Yorkshire side only two. Burnley have their relegation confirmed when they lose 2–1 at home to Derby County. They join Blackpool in the Second Division next season.
- 26 April 1971: Leeds United keep their slender title hopes alive by beating Arsenal 1–0 at Elland Road. Arsenal need to win their last two fixtures to be sure of the title.
- 3 May 1971: A Ray Kennedy goal gives Arsenal a 1–0 away win over North London rivals Tottenham Hotspur at White Hart Lane and confirms them as First Division champions.
- 8 May 1971: Arsenal become only the second club this century – and the fourth in history – to complete the double of the league title and FA Cup with a 2–1 win over Liverpool in the Wembley final in extra time, with substitute Eddie Kelly (the first to score in an FA Cup final) scoring their first goal and young forward Charlie George scoring a late winner.
- 10 May 1971: Liverpool sign 20-year-old striker Kevin Keegan from Scunthorpe United for £33,000.
- 19 May 1971: Chelsea draw 1–1 with Real Madrid of Spain in the European Cup Winners' Cup final in Athens.
- 21 May 1971: Chelsea win the European Cup Winners' Cup final replay 2–1 with goals from John Dempsey and Peter Osgood.
- 28 May 1971: Leeds United draw 2–2 with Juventus in Turin as they contest the first leg of the Inter-Cities Fairs Cup final. The original match had been abandoned two days before, due to heavy rain.
- 3 June 1971: Leeds United lift the Inter-Cities Fairs Cup on away goals after drawing the second leg of the final 1–1 at Elland Road.
- 8 June 1971: Manchester United appoint Leicester City's Frank O'Farrell as their new manager.
