= Colin Harvey =

English footballer

Personal information
- Full name: James Colin Harvey
- Date of birth: 16 November 1944 (age 81)
- Place of birth: Liverpool, England
- Position: Midfielder

Senior career*
Years	Team	Apps	(Gls)
1963–1974	Everton	320	(18)
1974–1976	Sheffield Wednesday	45	(2)
Total		365	(20)

International career
1971	England	1	(0)

Managerial career
- 1987–1990: Everton
- * Club domestic league appearances and goals

James Colin Harvey (born 16 November 1944) is an English former professional footballer who is best known for his time as a player, coach and manager with Everton.

== Playing career ==
Harvey was born in Liverpool, England and joined Everton as an apprentice in 1960. Harvey was often described as an elegant and skilful player and was nicknamed the "White Pelé" by Everton fans. "A beautiful footballer this boy" commented Kenneth Wolstenhome during the 1968 FA Cup final, while Goal magazine called him "a delightful player to watch". The 'White Pele' nickname came about because of his natural ability, grace and technique:

It was when I made my debut for Sheffield Wednesday at Bolton. My dad had brought me back and I got a few phone calls asking how the game had gone, and someone told me that there was a banner at the Park End at Goodison saying something about me and the white Pele – it was a very proud moment for me! For someone to say that about you comparing you to probably the best player that ever played the game is really unbelievable. To think that people thought that much of me was hard to believe.

— Everton Secrets – Colin Harvey's autobiography. (ISBN 0954687167)

=== Debut ===
Harvey made his debut in 1963, aged 18, against Italian side Inter Milan in a European Cup tie in the chaotic San Siro Stadium. He became a first team regular during the 1964–65 season.

Of the occasion he said:

[I found I was playing] on the afternoon of the game. We had lunch and then we had a team meeting. Harry Catterick said there would be only one change. He said "Dennis Stevens – you move to number 4 and Colin Harvey goes to number 8" This was all because Gabby was injured at the time. It was as simple as that! I just gasped, I didn't have a clue that I was going to play – it was a great way of doing it, he didn't give me a chance to think about it, I just had to go out there and play! I thought no-one was going to expect too much of me, I just went out there and done my best and I did okay.

=== Holy Trinity ===
Harvey became a part of the famous midfield trio known as the "Holy Trinity" with Alan Ball and Howard Kendall. Widely regarded as the best midfield of their generation, they were the key components of Everton's Football League First Division winning team in the 1969–70 season captained by Brian Labone. In an interview in the late 1970s, Harry Catterick claimed that in terms of "skill and ability, Colin was the best of the three". Of the late 1960s/early 70s Everton side, George Best said "they were a delight to watch and indeed play against." It was in fact Harvey's superb solo goal which clinched the title at Goodison Park vs West Bromwich Albion which has been described as one of the best ever goals to win the league championship. He also helped Everton win the 1970 FA Charity Shield.

=== After Everton ===
In 1974 he left Everton to join Sheffield Wednesday, where he finished his playing career shortly afterwards.

=== England ===
Despite his success at club level Harvey only made one appearance for the senior England team; this coming in a UEFA Euro 1972 qualification game against Malta.

== Managerial career ==
After leading Everton to the First Division title in 1986–87, Kendall left to manage Athletic Bilbao and Harvey stepped up to manage Everton. Harvey led them to the 1987 FA Charity Shield and managed the club until 1990, when Kendall returned to manage Everton and Harvey stepped down to be his assistant.

Harvey left Everton shortly after Kendall's departure in December 1993, he then had a brief spell as assistant manager at Mansfield Town and in November 1994 became assistant to Oldham Athletic's new player-manager Graeme Sharp following the departure of Joe Royle to Everton. Sharp left Oldham in March 1997, and Harvey followed him out of the Boundary Park exit door, but was soon back in the game as Burnley assistant manager to Adrian Heath, however after just a matter of months he was appointed Everton's youth coach when Howard Kendall became manager for a third time. Evertonians have nominated Colin Harvey for an MBE for over forty years worth of service to Everton F.C.

In 2008 Harvey began working for Bolton Wanderers, during Gary Megson's tenure at the club. In July 2012 it was announced that Harvey had left his chief scouting role after just over four years at the club.

== Personal life ==
Harvey is married to Maureen and lives in Aughton, Lancashire.

Colin Harvey's brother, Brian Harvey, was a footballer who forged a career playing for clubs on four continents before coaching in Hong Kong and Oklahoma.

== Honours ==
=== As a player ===
Everton

- Football League First Division: 1969–70
- FA Cup: 1965–66; runner-up: 1967–68
- FA Charity Shield: 1970

=== As a manager ===
Everton

- FA Cup runner-up: 1988–89
- Full Members' Cup runner-up: 1988–89
