= Albert Dunlop =

English Football Player

Personal information
- Date of birth: 21 April 1932
- Place of birth: Liverpool, England
- Date of death: 6 March 1990 (aged 57)
- Position: Goalkeeper

Senior career*
Years	Team	Apps	(Gls)
1950–1963	Everton	231	(0)
1963–1965	Wrexham	15	(0)
1965–1966	Rhyl	?	

Managerial career
- 1965–1966: Rhyl(player-manager)
- * Club domestic league appearances and goals

Albert Dunlop (21 April 1932 – 6 March 1990) was an English football goalkeeper.

== Football career ==
Signed by Everton as a junior in 1950, Dunlop had to wait until October 1956, to make his debut when he replaced Jimmy O'Neill at Old Trafford. It was to be remarkable debut for him, Manchester United were the reigning League Champions and had been unbeaten in the last 26 games but Everton won 5–2. In the next game Arsenal were beaten 4–0 and Dunlop kept his place until the end of the season.

Dunlop was unchallenged for the goalkeeper's jersey for the next six years and in 1960–61 was an ever-present and helped the club to 5th in the first division, their highest post war position. The following season, he was to play in the first 29 games before being replaced by Gordon West as Everton started to build for the future.

Dunlop's last game for Everton was to be the club's best post war moment as they beat Fulham at Goodison Park to clinch the 1962–63 League title, during the summer he was to leave and joined Wrexham. He then joined Rhyl in September 1965 as a goalkeeper initially, and by February 1966 had been appointed full-time manager and commercial director of the club. He was quite a flamboyant character, and when the club was going through a rough patch he once selected himself as centre-forward to see what the problems were at first hand.

== Cricket career ==
Dunlop made four appearances for Cheshire in the 1959 Minor Counties Championship.
