= Howard Kendall =

English footballer and manager

- Kendall on Saint and Greavsie, 1990

Personal information
- Full name: Howard Kendall
- Date of birth: 22 May 1946
- Place of birth: Ryton, England
- Date of death: 17 October 2015 (aged 69)
- Place of death: Southport, England
- Height: 5 ft 7 in (1.70 m)
- Position: Midfielder

Youth career
- 1961–1963: Preston North End

Senior career*
Years	Team	Apps	(Gls)
1963–1967	Preston North End	104	(13)
1967–1974	Everton	229	(21)
1974–1977	Birmingham City	115	(16)
1977–1979	Stoke City	82	(9)
1979–1981	Blackburn Rovers	79	(6)
1981	Everton	4	(0)
Total		613	(65)

Managerial career
- 1979–1981: Blackburn Rovers
- 1981–1987: Everton
- 1987–1989: Athletic Bilbao
- 1989–1990: Manchester City
- 1990–1993: Everton
- 1994: Xanthi
- 1995: Notts County
- 1995–1997: Sheffield United
- 1997–1998: Everton
- 1998–1999: Ethnikos Piraeus
- * Club domestic league appearances and goals

Howard Kendall (22 May 1946 – 17 October 2015) was an English footballer and manager.

Kendall joined Preston North End as an apprentice and stayed with the club when he turned professional. He was a runner-up in the 1964 FA Cup with Preston, and at 17 years 345 days old was the youngest player to play in a Wembley final. In 1967, he joined Everton, where he played as a midfielder with Alan Ball and Colin Harvey, the trio gaining the nickname "The Holy Trinity". With Everton, Kendall won the First Division title, the Charity Shield and was again an FA Cup runner-up. He became Everton club captain for three years, before being sold to Birmingham City in 1974. Kendall joined Stoke City in 1977, where he became a player-coach and helped the club achieve promotion from the Second Division.

Kendall's managerial career began as a player-manager with Blackburn Rovers in 1979. He returned to Everton in 1981, again as a player-manager, but retired from playing after four games. With Everton, he won two Football League titles, an FA Cup, three Charity Shields, and the 1985 European Cup Winners' Cup, as well as a league runners-up place and reached two further FA Cup finals and a League Cup final. In 1987, Kendall left to manage Spanish club Athletic Bilbao. He was sacked in 1989, but quickly returned to management with Manchester City. After less than a year in Manchester, he returned to Everton but, after three mid-table seasons, he resigned and spent a short time as manager of Greek side Xanthi. After a few months spent as manager of Notts County, Kendall joined Sheffield United, saving the club from relegation and taking them to the 1997 play-off final. He returned to Everton for the third time as manager in June 1997, but left the club by mutual consent a year later, having only managed to avoid relegation on the final day of the season. His final managerial position was a four-month position in Greece, where he took charge of Ethnikos Piraeus, but was sacked with the team last in the league.

Kendall is a member of the League Managers Association's "Hall of Fame", the English Football Hall of Fame, and listed as an "Everton Giant." Kendall remains the last English manager to win a UEFA competition with an English club.

== Playing career ==
Born in Ryton, Kendall joined Preston North End as an apprentice in 1961. He began playing professionally in May 1963 and played in the 1964 FA Cup Final against West Ham United. At the time, he was the youngest player to appear in a Wembley final, due to the regular left-half Ian Davidson being suspended by the club for an unauthorised trip to Scotland. He was aged 17 years 345 days and was the youngest finalist since James Prinsep played for Clapham Rovers in the 1879 final aged 17 years 245 days. Preston North End lost the final in the last minute.

Originally a defender, Kendall was wanted by Bill Shankly at Liverpool. Liverpool failed to provide the funds, so he joined Everton for £85,000 in March 1967 where he was moved into midfield with Alan Ball and Colin Harvey. The trio gained the nickname "The Holy Trinity". They were a major component of the Everton team that reached the 1968 FA Cup Final, which they lost. They went on to win the First Division title in the 1969–70 season. In the 1970–71 season, Everton won the 1970 Charity Shield, with Kendall scoring the winning goal. During the next three seasons, Kendall captained Everton as the side struggled to build on winning the league, with a 17th-place finish in the 1972–73 season. He was sold to Birmingham City in February 1974 and he spent four seasons at St Andrew's helping Birmingham stay in the First Division and reach the FA Cup semi-final in 1975.

Kendall joined Stoke City in August 1977 for a fee of £40,000. Stoke City, under the management of George Eastham, had the task of regaining their place in the top flight following relegation. Poor results in the early 1977–78 season saw Eastham sacked and replaced by Alan Durban in February 1978. Durban appoint Kendall as player-coach, who thrived in the role and his performances earned him the club's inaugural player of the year award. Durban built the team around Kendall for the 1978–79 season. Stoke City finished in third-place, gaining promotion back to the First Division. Despite Durban wanting Kendall to continue playing for him in the First Division, Kendall decided to join Third Division Blackburn Rovers as player-manager.

Kendall never played for England at senior level despite being included in several squads. However, he won caps at Schoolboy, Youth and Under-23 level, captaining the England Youth side to victory in the 1964 Little World Cup Final.

== Style of play ==
In the same vein as his midfield partner, Alan Ball, Kendall was a complete and combative midfielder who was a good passer of the ball, could tackle, defend and attack. Fellow Everton teammate Joe Royle described Kendall as a fair player and praised him for being in the right place at the right time.

== Managerial career ==
In June 1979, Kendall was assigned as player-manager at Blackburn Rovers, helping them win promotion back up to the Second Division in the 1979–80 season and narrowly missing out on promotion to the top tier in 1981 on goal difference.

=== First spell at Everton ===
In May 1981, Kendall returned to Everton as player-manager, in the hopes of restoring the club to its former glory, although he only played four games before finally retiring as a player in December 1981. On his return to Goodison Park as manager, he made 7 signings, including goalkeeper Neville Southall from Bury – who would go on to spend 17 years at the club and play a major part in five major trophy successes. Over the next two seasons, he signed more players - including right winger Trevor Steven and midfielder Peter Reid. Everton finished 8th in Kendall's first season as manager and an improved 7th a year later, but began the 1983–84 season poorly, winning just 6 of their first 21 league games and standing on the brink of the relegation zone.

Kendall was reportedly on the verge of being sacked, but the second half of the season was a very different story. Helped by the £250,000 signing of Wolves striker Andy Gray in November, Everton's league form improved. They once again finished 7th and reached the League Cup final (losing to Liverpool in a replay) and went on to win the FA Cup (beating Watford 2–0) at the end of the season. In the 1984–85 season, Everton won the league title, finishing 13 points clear of runners-up Liverpool, and the European Cup-Winners' Cup, defeating Austrian side Rapid Vienna, and reached the final of the FA Cup again. Everton narrowly failed to win both the league and the FA Cup in 1985–86 – runners-up in both to Liverpool – but in the 1986–87 season, once again won the league, nine points clear of their local rivals as well as a third consecutive Charity Shield, as the Merseyside clubs continued their stranglehold on the English game.

During his first spell at Goodison Park, he built an almost entirely new team which proved itself as one of the finest of the whole decade. He brought in younger players such as Peter Reid and Trevor Steven from smaller clubs to give them the opportunity to prove that they could compete at the highest level, and was largely successful. He also brought in established star players such as Andy Gray, who was instrumental in a season and a half after joining them in November 1983, his goals transforming a struggling side into FA Cup winners and then league champions and European Cup Winners' Cup winners. He then sold Gray to Aston Villa and brought in Gary Lineker, who scored 38 goals in the 1985–86 season, albeit narrowly failing to win the major trophies. Everton had toppled Manchester United as league leaders in early February before being overhauled by Liverpool during the final stages of the season, surrendering the title to their local rivals on the final weekend of the season. They were then beaten 3–1 in an all-Merseyside FA Cup final.

Kendall left Everton in June 1987, frustrated by the ban from Europe of English clubs, to manage Athletic Bilbao in Spain. As well as the missed opportunity of more European success with Everton, the ban on English clubs in European competitions was a major factor in some of England's leading players moving overseas during this time – including Gary Lineker, who signed for Barcelona after just one season at Goodison Park. The ban on English clubs resulted in Everton twice missing out on competing in the European Cup.

=== Athletic Bilbao and Manchester City ===
Kendall's time in Bilbao was not a great success, hindered by limitations on the players he could sign for the Basque club, though his popularity with the supporters was boosted by his assurances that he would not seek to change their traditions. He did manage to lead Bilbao to a fourth place finish in La Liga in his first season, and qualify for the following season's UEFA Cup, where they were eliminated by Juventus. He turned down an offer to manage Newcastle United in November 1988 in order to remain in Spain, but was sacked a year later on 15 November 1989, after a poor run of results and speculation began immediately about where his next job would be. There were frequent reports that he would be the next England manager when Bobby Robson eventually departed. On 7 December 1989, he returned to England as manager of Manchester City and secured their survival with a comfortable 14th-place finish. Kendall's name had also been linked to Manchester United, whose disappointing form that season was leading to media talk – as well as calls from fans – for manager Alex Ferguson to be sacked. In the event, Ferguson kept his job and went on to guide United to numerous trophies until his retirement 23 years later.

With the announcement in late May that Bobby Robson would step down as England manager after the 1990 FIFA World Cup, Kendall's name was inevitably mentioned by the press as a likely successor. However, he quickly dismissed the speculation and declined an offer by The Football Association to be interviewed for the role, which ultimately went to Graham Taylor. Kendall was suggested again as a possible choice for the England job after Taylor resigned in November 1993, but Terry Venables was appointed.

=== Return to Everton ===
He returned to Everton for a second spell as manager on 5 November 1990 following the sacking of Colin Harvey a week prior, who was re-appointed to the club as his assistant. This was despite the fact he had built a strong Manchester City side that was near the top of the First Division table, and had only just held their cross-city rivals Manchester United to a thrilling 3–3 draw at Maine Road. He famously justified the move by saying that Manchester City was just an affair, but Everton was his marriage. By this stage, Everton were battling against relegation to the Second Division, but he managed to turn their season around and they finished 9th and also reached the FA Cup quarter-finals, defeating Liverpool in the fifth round.

In August 1991, he signed 30-year-old striker Peter Beardsley from Liverpool for £1million, in what proved to be a successful transfer as the ageing striker excelled at Goodison Park, scoring 32 goals in two seasons before signing for Newcastle United. Three months later he added another new striker to the revamped Everton attack, when he paid £1.5million for Rangers striker Mo Johnston, but this signing was less successful and Johnston was given a free transfer two years later, after failing to attract buyers.

Everton could only manage mid-table league finishes in 1992 and 1993 and Kendall finally resigned on 4 December 1993, after a poor run of form in the league and following a dispute with the board of directors, who had blocked his attempt to sign Manchester United striker Dion Dublin.

=== Later years ===
After leaving Everton for the second time, Kendall took charge of Greek club Xanthi for a short and largely unsuccessful period. In January 1995, Kendall returned to English football, taking over at First Division Notts County who were struggling badly after a nightmare start to the season, but under Kendall's leadership there was an improvement, with County winning their first two games under his tenure. However, a series of rows with chairman Derek Pavis led to Kendall being sacked in April 1995 – their poor form continued after his departure and the team were relegated to Division Two at the end of the season. Subsequently, Kendall joined Sheffield United in December 1995, saving the club from relegation and then taking them to the 1997 play-off final, where they lost to Crystal Palace. Kendall returned to Everton for a third time as manager in June 1997, but left the club by mutual consent at the end of the season, having only managed to avoid relegation on the final day of the season. His third spell was marked by turmoil within the club, working for then chairman, Peter Johnson.

Kendall moved to Greek side Ethnikos Piraeus, but was sacked in March 1999, after only four months in charge and with the club 8 points adrift at the bottom of the Greek First Division. It was Kendall's last role in football management, although in 2001 he revealed that he had "had offers" from a number of English clubs which he rejected, and he expressed interest in the Republic of Ireland managers' job, which was eventually given to Giovanni Trapattoni. Kendall remains the last English manager to win a European competition with an English club. He was inducted into the English Football Hall of Fame in 2005, in recognition of his contribution as a manager to the English game.

== Death ==
Kendall died on 17 October 2015 of a heart attack at the Southport and Formby District General Hospital at the age of 69.

== Career statistics ==
=== As a player ===
Appearances and goals by club, season and competition
Club	Season	League			FA Cup		League Cup		Other^{[A]}		Total	
Club	Season	Division	Apps	Goals	Apps	Goals	Apps	Goals	Apps	Goals	Apps	Goals
Preston North End	1962–63	Second Division	2	0	0	0	0	0	0	0	2	0
Preston North End	1963–64	Second Division	9	1	5	1	0	0	0	0	14	2
Preston North End	1964–65	Second Division	29	7	2	1	1	0	0	0	32	8
Preston North End	1965–66	Second Division	39	4	6	0	3	0	0	0	48	4
Preston North End	1966–67	Second Division	25	1	1	0	2	0	0	0	28	1
Preston North End	Total		104	13	14	2	6	0	0	0	124	15
Everton	1966–67	First Division	4	0	0	0	0	0	0	0	4	0
Everton	1967–68	First Division	38	6	6	1	2	2	0	0	46	9
Everton	1968–69	First Division	29	1	3	0	4	0	0	0	36	1
Everton	1969–70	First Division	36	4	1	0	4	1	0	0	41	5
Everton	1970–71	First Division	40	2	6	2	0	0	7	3	53	7
Everton	1971–72	First Division	35	4	4	0	0	0	0	0	39	4
Everton	1972–73	First Division	40	4	2	0	1	0	0	0	43	4
Everton	1973–74	First Division	7	0	1	0	0	0	0	0	8	0
Everton	Total		229	21	23	3	11	3	7	3	270	30
Birmingham City	1973–74	First Division	15	1	0	0	0	0	0	0	15	1
Birmingham City	1974–75	First Division	39	4	6	1	1	0	6	0	52	5
Birmingham City	1975–76	First Division	36	8	1	0	2	0	0	0	39	8
Birmingham City	1976–77	First Division	25	3	2	1	1	0	0	0	28	4
Birmingham City	Total		115	16	9	2	4	0	6	0	134	18
Stoke City	1977–78	Second Division	42	7	2	0	1	0	0	0	45	7
Stoke City	1978–79	Second Division	40	2	1	0	5	1	0	0	46	3
Stoke City	Total		82	9	3	0	6	1	0	0	91	10
Blackburn Rovers	1979–80	Third Division	41	2	6	0	4	1	2	0	53	3
Blackburn Rovers	1980–81	Second Division	38	4	0	0	3	0	2	0	43	4
Blackburn Rovers	Total		79	6	6	0	7	1	4	0	96	7
Everton	1981–82	First Division	4	0	1	0	1	0	0	0	6	0
Everton	Total		4	0	1	0	1	0	0	0	6	0
Career total			613	65	56	7	35	5	17	3	721	80

A. The "Other" column constitutes appearances and goals in the Anglo-Scottish Cup, European Cup, FA Charity Shield and Texaco Cup.

=== As a manager ===
Managerial record by team and tenure
Team	From	To	Record				
Team	From	To	P	W	D	L	Win %
Blackburn Rovers	1 June 1979	1 June 1981	105	48	33	24	45.7
Everton	1 June 1981	18 June 1987	338	183	78	77	54.1
Athletic Bilbao	18 June 1987	11 November 1989	102	44	29	29	43.1
Manchester City	6 December 1989	5 November 1990	39	13	18	8	33.3
Everton	5 November 1990	4 December 1993	162	63	40	59	38.9
Skoda Xanthi	1 July 1994	30 October 1994	10	5	3	2	50.0
Notts County	12 January 1995	1 April 1995	15	4	4	7	26.7
Sheffield United	12 December 1995	27 June 1997	82	34	27	21	41.5
Everton	27 June 1997	25 June 1998	42	11	13	18	26.2
Ethnikos Piraeus	3 December 1998	18 March 1999	13	0	5	8	0.0
Total			908	405	250	253	44.6

== Honours ==
=== Player ===
Preston North End

- FA Cup runner-up: 1963–64

Everton

- Football League First Division: 1969–70
- FA Charity Shield: 1970
- FA Cup runner-up: 1967–68

Stoke City

- Football League Second Division third-place promotion: 1978–79

Individual

- Stoke City Player of the Year: 1977–78

=== Manager ===
Blackburn Rovers

- Football League Third Division runner-up: 1979–80

Everton

- Football League First Division: 1984–85, 1986–87
- FA Cup: 1983–84; runner-up: 1984–85, 1985–86
- FA Charity Shield: 1984, 1985, 1986 (shared)
- European Cup Winners' Cup: 1984–85
- Football League Cup runner-up: 1983–84
- Full Members' Cup runner-up: 1990–91

Notts County

- Anglo-Italian Cup: 1994–95

Individual

- English Manager of the Year: 1984–85, 1986–87
- Premier League Manager of the Month: January 1998

== See also ==
- List of English football championship winning managers
