= Alan Whittle =

English footballer

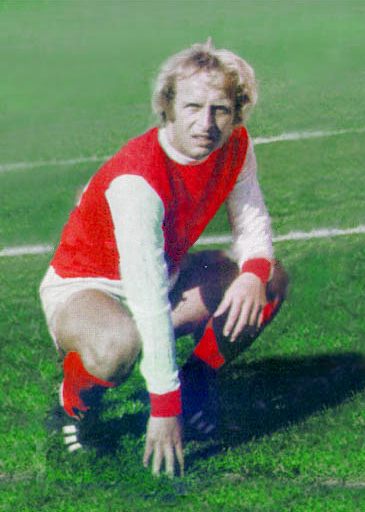
- Whittle with Persepolis in 1977–78

Personal information
- Full name: Alan Whittle
- Date of birth: 10 March 1950 (age 76)
- Place of birth: Liverpool, England
- Height: 5 ft 7 in (1.70 m)
- Positions: Midfielder; forward

Youth career
- 1965–1967: Everton

Senior career*
Years	Team	Apps	(Gls)
1967–1972	Everton	74	(21)
1972–1976	Crystal Palace	108	(19)
1976	Sheffield United	0	(0)
1976–1977	Orient	33	(5)
1977–1978	Persepolis	26	(13)
1979–1980	Orient	17	(1)
1981	AFC Bournemouth	9	(0)
1981–1982	Preston Makedonia	40	(4)
1982–1983	Gravesend & Northfleet	?	(?)
Total		275	(55)

International career
1965	England Schoolboys	4	(1)
1968	England Youth	1	(0)
1970	England U23	1	(0)
- * Club domestic league appearances and goals

Alan Whittle (born 10 March 1950) is an English retired footballer who played as a forward or attacking midfielder. He made a total of 241 Football League appearances for Everton, Crystal Palace, Orient and AFC Bournemouth, scoring 46 goals. He also spent a season with Iranian side Persepolis where he made 34 appearances and scored 16 goals.

== Club career ==
Whittle was a product of the Everton youth academy and debuted for the first-team in 1967 at the age of 17. In five years at Everton Whittle made 74 appearances scoring 21 goals, but found it difficult to establish himself in the first-team. Whittle's nickname was The Hustler at Everton, though he campaigned in The Toffees football in the community scheme. The highlight of his time at Everton was being part of the side that won the First Division in the 1969–70 season; making 15 appearances and scoring 11 goals in the process.

In December 1972, Whittle was sold to Crystal Palace for a then large fee of £100,000. Whittle spent four years of his career at Palace; however, his stay was dogged by injury and bad form, leading him to fall out of favour with then coach Malcolm Allison, Whittle did make a century of appearances for Palace and was a fan favourite. Palace fans would chant "We want Whittle" and "The Roker roar is no more, Whittle showed them how to score".

Whittle spent two one-season spells at Orient scoring six goals in 50 appearances for the club and coming second in the Anglo-Scottish Cup. Whittle surprised many by spending one season at Iranian club Persepolis F.C. in the 1977–78 season where he competed in the Takht Jamshid Cup, however because of the Iranian Revolution and collapse of the national league Whittle had no choice but to leave Iran. Whittle was the first English footballer ever to play in the Iranian football league system.

Ultimately, Whittle ended his career at AFC Bournemouth at the age of 30 making just nine appearances for the club. Towards the end of Whittle's career he made a move to Australia, where he played for a year before going to non-league side Gravesend & Northfleet in 1982 ending a career for Whittle who as a youngster had much promise but injury and poor form were to block the extent of his success.

== International career ==
In 1972, at the age of 22, he was called up by Sir Alf Ramsey, manager of the England national football team; however, he did not feature for the side.

== Honours ==
Everton

- Football League: 1969–70
- FA Charity Shield: 1970

== Personal life ==
Whittle is the uncle of current Sheffield United player Tom Davies. Now retired, Whittle lives on The Wirral.
