= Tommy Wright (footballer, born 1944) =

English footballer (1944–2026)

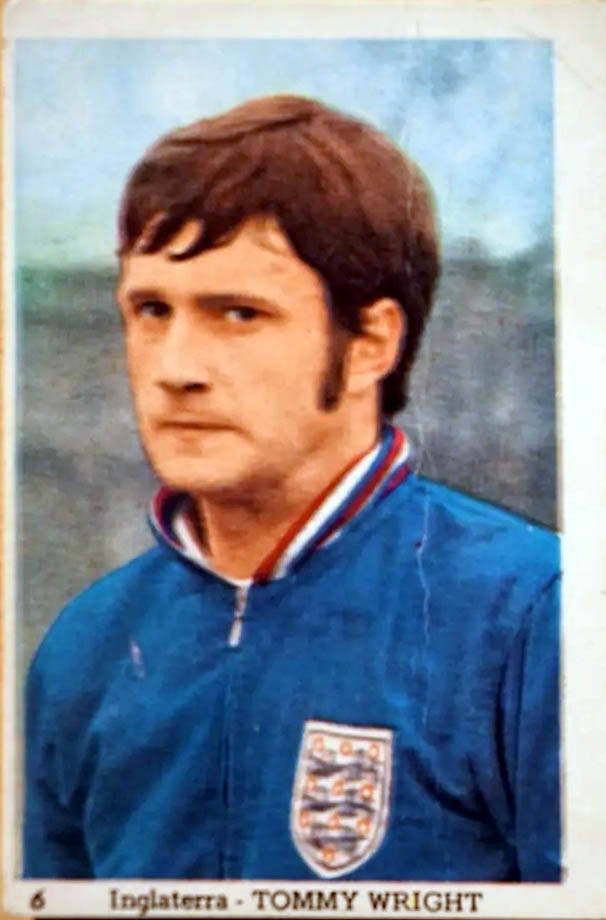
- Wright depicted in an Argentine football card, 1970

Personal information
- Full name: Thomas James Wright
- Date of birth: 21 October 1944
- Place of birth: Liverpool, England
- Date of death: 20 January 2026 (aged 81)
- Position: Right-back

Senior career*
Years	Team	Apps	(Gls)
1964–1974	Everton	308	(4)

International career
1968–1970	England	12	(0)
- * Club domestic league appearances and goals

Thomas James Wright (21 October 1944 – 20 January 2026) was an English footballer who played as a right-back. A one-club man, he played for Everton, with whom he won the Football League and the FA Cup, and represented England, including at the 1970 FIFA World Cup.

== Club career ==
Wright was born in Norris Green, Liverpool on 21 October 1944. He joined Everton as an apprentice, and made his first team debut in 1964. He was part of the winning team in the 1966 FA Cup final, in the unsuccessful team in the 1968 FA Cup final and played all 42 league games in the 1969–70 season when Everton won the Football League Championship by nine points. He also won the 1970 FA Charity Shield. He made 374 appearances in total and scored four goals.

He has often been described as the best right-back to play for Everton. George Best once described Wright as his most difficult opponent.

== International career ==
Wright made twelve appearances for England including the classic match against Brazil in the 1970 FIFA World Cup in Mexico. Wright made his debut for England in the game in which England beat the Soviet Union in the third place match in the 1968 European Football Championship in Italy, the only player to make his England debut in a European Championship finals match.

== Retirement and death ==
Wright retired in 1974 due to injury. His contributions to Everton were noted in the years following his retirement. He was named as an inaugural member of Gwladys Street's Hall of Fame in 1996, and as an "Everton Giant" in 2016.

Wright died on 20 January 2026, at the age of 81.

== Career statistics ==
Appearances and goals by club, season and competition
Club	Season	League			FA Cup		League Cup		Europe		FA Charity Shield		Total	
Club	Season	Division	Apps	Goals	Apps	Goals	Apps	Goals	Apps	Goals	Apps	Goals	Apps	Goals
Everton	1964–65	First Division	22	0	3	0	0	0	3	0	0	0	28	0
Everton	1965–66	First Division	36	0	6	0	0	0	4	0	0	0	46	0
Everton	1966–67	First Division	42	0	6	0	0	0	4	0	1	0	53	0
Everton	1967–68	First Division	38	0	6	0	2	0	0	0	0	0	46	0
Everton	1968–69	First Division	41	1	5	0	4	0	0	0	0	0	50	1
Everton	1969–70	First Division	42	1	1	0	4	0	0	0	0	0	47	1
Everton	1970–71	First Division	40	2	6	0	0	0	6	0	1	0	53	2
Everton	1971–72	First Division	17	0	1	0	0	0	0	0	0	0	18	0
Everton	1972–73	First Division	30	0	2	0	1	0	0	0	0	0	33	0
Career total			308	4	36	0	11	0	17	0	2	0	374	4

== Honours ==
Everton

- FA Cup: 1965–66; runner-up: 1967–68

== Sources ==
- Everton – School of Science by James Corbett Pan Books 2003 ISBN 0-330-42006-2
