= Johnny Morrissey =

English footballer

Personal information
- Date of birth: 18 April 1940 (age 86)
- Place of birth: Liverpool, Lancashire, England
- Position: Outside left

Youth career
- Liverpool

Senior career*
Years	Team	Apps	(Gls)
1957–1962	Liverpool	36	(6)
1962–1972	Everton	259	(43)
1972–1973	Oldham Athletic	6	(1)
Total		301	(50)
- * Club domestic league appearances and goals

John Morrissey (born 18 April 1940) is an English former professional footballer who played in the Football League for Liverpool, Everton and Oldham Athletic, and won the Football League Championship with Everton in both 1962–63 and 1969–70.

== Career ==
Morrissey was born in Liverpool, and began his football career as a junior with Liverpool, signing professional forms when he turned 17, and making his debut in September 1957. He played as an outside left, and was unable to dislodge Alan A'Court from that position in the first team.

In 1962 he "crossed the park" to join Everton for a fee of £10,000, sold without manager Bill Shankly's knowledge. He scored on his Everton debut, in the first league Merseyside derby in 11 seasons, which finished as a 2–2 draw, and went on to help the club to the First Division title in his first season.

He scored the goal in the semi-final that took Everton to the 1968 FA Cup Final, and played on the losing side in that match. In the 1969–70 season he helped Everton win the First Division for a second time playing the full 90 minutes in 41 of the 42 games and contributing nine goals from the left-wing. In 10 years with Everton, Morrissey scored 50 goals from 314 games in all competitions. Despite his small stature Morrissey had a reputation as an uncompromising player, Jimmy Greaves once commenting that he "always got the retaliation in first!" Johnny Giles, whilst recognising Morrissey's unflinching style, commented on him: "Well Johnny Morrissey, first of all, was a top-class player. He was a terrific player."

He finished his career with a brief stay at Oldham Athletic, which brought his total of League appearances over the 300 mark. His son John had a successful career with Tranmere Rovers making 470 League appearances for them between 1985 and 1999.

== Honours ==
Everton

- First Division: 1962–63, 1969–70
- FA Cup runner-up: 1967–68
