= Jimmy Husband =

English footballer (1947–2024)

Personal information
- Full name: James Husband
- Date of birth: 15 October 1947
- Place of birth: Newcastle upon Tyne, England
- Date of death: 9 March 2024 (aged 76)
- Position: Forward

Youth career
- 1963–1964: Everton

Senior career*
Years	Team	Apps	(Gls)
1964–1973	Everton	165	(44)
1973–1978	Luton Town	143	(44)
1978–1980	Memphis Rogues	80	(22)
1981–1982	Cleveland Force (indoor)	33	(9)
1982–1983	Oklahoma City Slickers		
Total		421	(119)

International career
- England Schools
- England Youth
1967–1970	England U23	5	(1)
- * Club domestic league appearances and goals

James Husband (15 October 1947 – 9 March 2024) was an English professional footballer who played in England and the United States as a forward.

== Club career ==
Born in Newcastle upon Tyne, Northumberland, Husband began his career with the youth teams of Everton, joining them in 1963. He turned professional in 1964, making his debut in April 1965, and scoring his first goal in January 1967. Husband played in every round as Everton reached the 1968 FA Cup Final, scoring twice away to Leicester City in the quarter final, but missed a key goalscoring opportunity in the Final itself, when the Blues lost 1-0 to West Bromwich Albion.

He was part of the side that won the First Division in the 1969–70 season; making 30 appearances and scoring 6 goals in the process. He also played as they won the 1970 FA Charity Shield.

He later played for Luton Town. Husband also played in the NASL for the Memphis Rogues. In 1982, he played for the Oklahoma City Slickers in the American Soccer League.

== International career ==
Husband played for England at Schools, Youth, and under-23 levels.

== Later life and death ==
After retirement, Husband ran a pub, eventually settling in Bedfordshire.

Husband died following a short illness on 9 March 2024, at the age of 76.

== Honours ==
Everton

- FA Cup runner-up: 1967–68
