= Brian Labone =

English footballer (1940–2006)

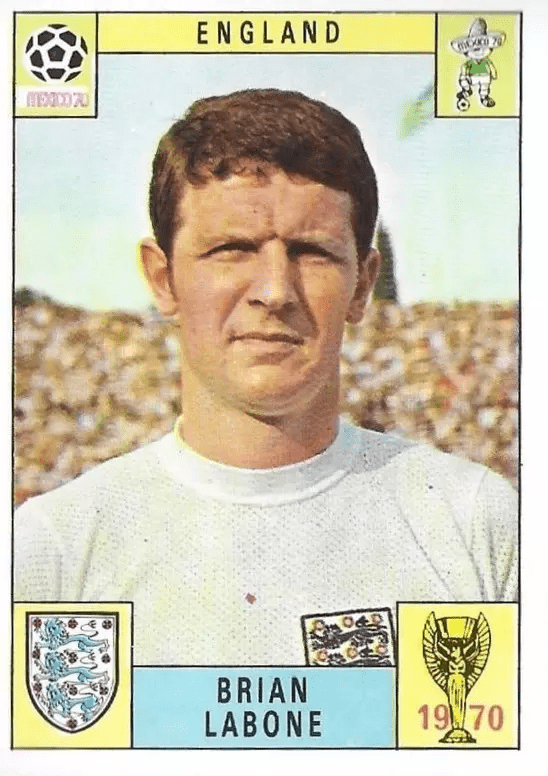
- Labone at the 1970 FIFA World Cup

Personal information
- Full name: Brian Leslie Labone
- Date of birth: 23 January 1940
- Place of birth: Liverpool, Lancashire, England
- Date of death: 24 April 2006 (aged 66)
- Place of death: Liverpool, England
- Position: Centre half

Senior career*
Years	Team	Apps	(Gls)
1958–1971	Everton	451	(2)

International career
1962–1970	England	26	(0)
- * Club domestic league appearances and goals

Brian Leslie Labone (23 January 1940 – 24 April 2006) was an English footballer who played for and captained Everton. A one-club man, Labone's professional career lasted from 1958 to 1971, during which he won the Football League championship twice and the FA Cup once. He also played 26 times for the England national team.

== Early life ==
Brian Labone was born in Liverpool, England, on 23 January 1940. He has 1 daughter, named Rachelle, who still lives in Liverpool. His parents were Arthur Leslie Labone and Bridget Patricia Rice. The Labone family have distant Italian roots on his paternal side through an ancestor called Nicholas Antonio Labone who taught various foreign languages in Glasgow, Scotland. He was also of Irish descent on his mother (Bridget Patricia Rice) side.

Labone attended the Liverpool Collegiate School.

== Career ==
Liverpool-born Labone chose to join Everton at 17 in July 1957 instead of going to university. His debut for the first team was in 1958. He was widely regarded as one of the best central defenders of his era. He was a strong tackler, good in the air, adequately fast but he rarely used his left foot.

Labone made 451 League appearances for Everton and a total of 534 in all competitions. He scored two league goals and was booked only twice throughout his career. Manager Harry Catterick called him "the last of the Corinthians". Labone played in the championship teams of 1962–63 and 1969–70, in the FA Cup winning team of 1966, and in the FA Cup final of 1968. He also won the FA Charity Shield in 1963 and 1970. Labone showed his high opinion of Everton in a simple quote "One Evertonian is worth twenty Liverpudlians"

Labone played 26 times for England national team between 1962 and 1970. He withdrew from England's 1966 World Cup squad because of his imminent marriage but played in three of the four games in the World Cup in 1970 in Mexico.

In 1970–71 Labone sustained a serious injury to his Achilles tendon and retired from playing. A few years earlier he had announced, at the beginning of the season, his intention to retire at the end of that season, in typical fashion giving the club as much notice as possible so that he could be replaced. Such was the outcry however that he changed his mind and played on for two more seasons.

=== Later life and death ===
Labone maintained his links with Everton where he worked as a guide for guests & visitors and a website columnist. Labone was included in Everton's 'Greatest Ever Team' as voted for by the fans at the start of the 2003–04 season to mark the club's 125th anniversary.

Whilst returning home from an Everton fans awards evening at the Winslow Hotel in Walton, Labone died suddenly after collapsing in the street close to his Lydiate home at the age of 66. He was survived by Pat, his wife of 40 years, and daughter Rachelle (born 1970).

Another former Everton captain, Kevin Ratcliffe, paid the following tribute: "Brian was Everton. If you could put together a team of every player that has ever captained Everton, every one of us would turn to Brian to lead us out. He will always be known as the captain of Everton". Everton Chairman Bill Kenwright also paid tribute by saying: "On the foot of the Dixie Dean statue outside Goodison Park are the words 'Footballer, Gentleman, Evertonian'. Those words summed up Dixie and they apply, equally, to the great Brian Labone." Part of Everton's home ground, Goodison Park, was named in his honour.

== Honours ==
Everton

- Football League First Division: 1962–63, 1969–70
- FA Cup: 1965–66; runner-up: 1967–68
- FA Charity Shield: 1963, 1970

Sporting positions
Preceded by Roy Vernon	Everton captain 1965–1970	Succeeded by Alan Ball
