= Joe Royle =

English footballer (born 1949)

Personal information
- Full name: Joseph Royle
- Date of birth: 8 April 1949 (age 77)
- Place of birth: Liverpool, England
- Position: Striker

Senior career*
Years	Team	Apps	(Gls)
1966–1974	Everton	232	(102)
1974–1977	Manchester City	99	(23)
1977–1980	Bristol City	101	(18)
1980–1982	Norwich City	42	(9)
Total		474	(152)

International career
1967	England Youth	3	(1)
1968–1971	England U23	10	(4)
1971–1977	England	6	(2)

Managerial career
- 1982–1994: Oldham Athletic
- 1994–1997: Everton
- 1998–2001: Manchester City
- 2002–2006: Ipswich Town
- 2009: Oldham Athletic
- 2016: Everton (caretaker)
- * Club domestic league appearances and goals

Joseph Royle (born 8 April 1949) is an English football manager and former footballer. In his playing career as a striker, he debuted for Everton at the age of 16 and went on to play for Manchester City, Bristol City, Norwich City, and the England national team. Later, he managed Oldham Athletic, Everton, Manchester City, and Ipswich Town. He is a director at Oldham Athletic.

== Playing career ==
=== Club career ===
Royle was born in the Norris Green area of Liverpool on 8 April 1949. He attended Ranworth Square Primary School in Norris Green and Quarry Bank High School in Liverpool's Allerton suburb, where he was an all-round sportsman. Unusually for a grammar schoolboy, he played for the Liverpool schoolboys team, which was usually drawn from secondary modern schools.

A number of clubs were interested in signing Royle, including Manchester United, but it was his hometown club Everton that succeeded in recruiting him to their ranks. He went on to make 270 appearances for Everton, scoring 119 times. He made his debut at the age of 16 and held the record of being the youngest player to play for Everton until James Vaughan beat the record on 10 April 2005 by 11 days. For five seasons he was Everton's top scorer, notably scoring 23 goals in the Championship-winning side of 1969–70. Manchester City manager Tony Book bought Royle for £170,000 in 1974 and he went on to claim further honours as he helped them to win the League Cup in 1976.

He left Maine Road in November 1977 to join Bristol City and had a further stint with Norwich City, including winning Norwich City player of the year in 1981, before being forced to retire from the game in 1982 (aged 33) due to a knee injury. In 2002, he was voted into the club's hall of fame by Norwich supporters. His time at Bristol City, however, had not been so fruitful. After a storming on-loan debut, scoring four, he only tallied another 14 goals in the remaining 100 games with them.

=== International career ===
Royle was awarded the first of his six England caps against Malta in 1971.

== Managerial career ==
=== Oldham Athletic ===
In June 1982, Royle moved into management in the Second Division at Oldham Athletic. He spent more than 12 years in charge at Boundary Park, taking them into the First Division in 1991 (a year before it became the FA Premier League) as Second Division champions. Royle's teams won many friends with their cavalier style of play, which was particularly evident during the season that they played on artificial turf on their home ground. Oldham reached a cup final for the first time in 1990 when they reached the final of the League Cup, but they were defeated 1–0 by Nottingham Forest. They also reached the FA Cup semi-finals that season, and held Manchester United to a 3–3 draw in the first match at Maine Road before losing the replay 2–1.

When England national football team manager Bobby Robson announced in May 1990 that he would be quitting the job after the World Cup that summer, Royle's name was strongly linked with the role and the Football Association shortlisted him along with Graham Taylor and Howard Kendall. This was despite Royle having yet to manage in the First Division; whereas in contrast Kendall had won two league titles, an FA Cup and European Cup Winners' Cup with Everton, and Taylor had taken both Aston Villa and Watford to runners-up spot in the top flight and Watford to an FA Cup final. Royle was selected on the shortlist ahead of Terry Venables, the Tottenham Hotspur manager whose managerial CV included taking Barcelona to the Spanish league title and to a European Cup final, as well as guiding Queen's Park Rangers to an FA Cup final in 1982. Venables himself had expressed interest in the job – which would finally become his in January 1994. In the event, Graham Taylor was appointed as England's new manager.

In 1991, Oldham finished champions of the Second Division, and were promoted to the First Division where they had last played 68 years earlier.

Royle was able to attract established stars to Oldham, as well as developing talent which would go on to excel at a higher level. These included striker Graeme Sharp – one of the most accomplished goalscorers of the past decade – who was signed from Everton in 1991, midfielder Mike Milligan (who was sold to Everton for £1 million in 1990 and signed back for £600,000 a year later), defender Earl Barrett (who was sold to Aston Villa for £1.7 million in 1992) and right-back Denis Irwin, who was signed on a free transfer from Leeds United in 1986 and was sold to Manchester United for £625,000 in 1990.

Oldham finished 17th in 1991–92 season – their first top flight campaign for almost 70 years – and secured their place in the new Premier League. A key game which helped ensure survival was a 5–1 home win over eventually relegated Luton Town, in which Graeme Sharp scored four goals. They also hosted Manchester United on Boxing Day 1991, losing 6–3 in one of the most thrilling league contests of the season.

Oldham survived on goal difference on the last day of the 1992–93 with a remarkable 4–3 home win over Southampton, their survival also boosted by an earlier 1–0 away win over Aston Villa – a victory which handed the title to Oldham's local rivals Manchester United. This result sent Crystal Palace down instead.

However, 1993–94 brought another battle against relegation and this time the Latics were unable to win it. They were rarely outside the bottom three all season. Another away win over Southampton at the end of March 1994 lifted the Latics out of the relegation zone and a 4–1 home win over QPR in the next game put them three points clear of the drop zone with two games in hand. However, a late Manchester United equaliser put their FA Cup dream on ice in the Wembley semi-final and they were defeated 4–1 three days later in the Maine Road replay. The Premier League campaign had already brought two thrilling matches between Oldham and their bigger local rivals - a 5–2 win for United at Boundary Park just after Christmas, and at the beginning of April the return match at Old Trafford saw the hosts win a closely-fought game 3–2.

The Latics failed to win any of their final eight games and a 1–1 draw at Norwich City on the final day of the season was not enough to stave off relegation. Royle remained in charge of Oldham despite their relegation, and oversaw their first few months in Division One.

=== Everton ===
After 12 years of managing Oldham, Royle returned to Everton in November 1994 to succeed manager Mike Walker, who had been dismissed after less than a year in charge following Everton's worst start to a league season, with no wins from their first 12 league games.

Royle permanently signed Scottish striker Duncan Ferguson, who was at Everton on loan. The club's league form improved under Royle, and they achieved Premier League survival at the beginning of May, finally achieving a 15th-place finish. After defeating Tottenham Hotspur 4–1 in the FA Cup semi-final, Everton went on to beat Manchester United 1–0 in the final, which remains their most recent major trophy to date.

That summer, Royle signed Manchester United's top scorer Andrei Kanchelskis for a club record £5 million, and Everton progressed further in 1995–96 as they finished sixth in the league, although they only reached the second round of the European Cup Winners' Cup, their first European campaign for 11 years. He then signed midfielder Gary Speed from Leeds United for £3.5 million in the summer of 1996, and paid a club record £5.75 million for Middlesbrough forward Nick Barmby later in 1996, but Everton's form in 1996–97 was less convincing and on transfer deadline day in 1997 he was not permitted to sign Norwegians Tore André Flo and Claus Eftevaag by chairman Peter Johnson, which led to his resignation. Everton were just four points above the relegation zone when Royle resigned, their form having dipped since the sale of Andrei Kanchelskis to Fiorentina two months earlier.

Royle was named an Everton Giant in 2004 for his successes as both a player and a manager for the team.

=== Manchester City ===
After 11 months out of the game, he accepted the challenge to manage Manchester City in February 1998. When Royle arrived the club was battling against relegation from Division One. They won their final game of the season 5–2 away to Stoke City, but both teams were relegated due to the other three relegation-threatened teams all winning. Royle's services were retained and he delivered an instant promotion the following season, as City beat Gillingham on penalties in the 1999 Division Two play-off final after drawing 2–2 in open play. A year later, he delivered City a second successive promotion as they finished runners-up in Division One and clinched a place in the Premier League on the final day of the league season. However, City were relegated straight back to Division One and Royle was sacked in May 2001.

=== Ipswich Town ===
After more than a year out of the game, Royle returned to football in October 2002 to manage Ipswich Town, who had been relegated from the Premier League the previous season and had dismissed long-serving manager George Burley. From February to May 2003 the club was in administration, which led to the exit of several key players and a restriction of transfer and wage funds. Royle twice led Ipswich to the play-offs, in 2004 and 2005, but lost on both occasions to West Ham United in the semi-finals. Several players were subsequently sold off to Premier League sides, and Ipswich finished 15th in the 2005–06 season, their lowest finish since 1966, and Royle left the club by mutual consent.

=== Later career ===
In December 2006, Royle was appointed as a Patron of Trust Oldham, the official supporter's association of Oldham Athletic. In November 2007, Royle was under serious consideration for the Leicester City and Wigan Athletic managerial roles, but decided to pull out of the running for both.

During his break from management, Royle co-commentated alongside the likes of John Helm and Tony Jones on Five's UEFA Cup Football coverage.

On 15 March 2009, Royle was re-appointed to Oldham Athletic on a temporary basis, following the resignation of John Sheridan. In April, he was offered the job on a permanent basis, but turned it down on 28 April, and announced that he would be leaving the club after the final game. On 2 May, in his final game, and the club's final game of the season, Royle led Oldham to a 2–1 away victory at Walsall.

On 2 June 2014, Royle joined Norwich City as a footballing consultant to new manager Neil Adams. On 14 July of the same year, Royle was appointed to help oversee the youth development at Everton, alongside David Unsworth. On 12 May 2016, following the departure of Roberto Martinez, Royle assisted Unsworth in taking charge of Everton's final game of the season against Norwich.

In October 2018, Royle was appointed as a director at Wigan Athletic, following the club's takeover.

In July 2022, Royle has been appointed as the director of Oldham Athletic after its takeover from the previous owners.

== Career statistics ==
Appearances and goals by club, season and competition (Note: Sourced from Rothmans Football Yearbooks)
Club	Season	League			FA Cup		League Cup		Europe		Other (Note: Includes FA Charity Shield (Everton) Texaco Cup (Manchester City).)		Total	
Club	Season	Division	Apps	Goals	Apps	Goals	Apps	Goals	Apps	Goals	Apps	Goals	Apps	Goals
Everton	1965–66	First Division	2	0	0	0	0	0	0	0	0	0	2	0
Everton	1966–67	First Division	4	3	0	0	0	0	0	0	0	0	4	3
Everton	1967–68	First Division	34	16	6	3	1	1	0	0	0	0	41	20
Everton	1968–69	First Division	42	22	5	4	4	3	0	0	0	0	51	29
Everton	1969–70	First Division	42	23	1	0	4	0	0	0	0	0	47	23
Everton	1970–71	First Division	40	17	5	2	0	0	6	4	1	0	52	23
Everton	1971–72	First Division	28	9	3	0	1	0	0	0	0	0	32	9
Everton	1972–73	First Division	14	7	0	0	1	0	0	0	0	0	15	7
Everton	1973–74	First Division	18	2	3	0	1	0	0	0	0	0	22	2
Everton	1974–75	First Division	8	3	0	0	2	0	0	0	0	0	10	3
Everton	Total		232	102	23	9	14	4	6	4	1	0	276	119
Manchester City	1974–75	First Division	16	1	0	0	0	0	0	0	0	0	16	1
Manchester City	1975–76	First Division	37	12	2	0	9	6	0	0	3	1	59	19
Manchester City	1976–77	First Division	39	7	4	2	1	0	2	0	0	0	46	9
Manchester City	1977–78	First Division	7	3	0	0	2	0	2	0	0	0	11	3
Manchester City	Total		99	23	6	2	12	6	4	0	3	1	124	32
Bristol City	1977–78	First Division	26	8	2	0	0	0	0	0	0	0	28	8
Bristol City	1978–79	First Division	40	7	2	0	1	0	0	0	0	0	43	7
Bristol City	1979–80	First Division	35	3	0	0	6	2	0	0	0	0	41	5
Bristol City	Total		101	18	4	0	7	2	0	0	0	0	112	20
Norwich City	1980–81	First Division	40	9	2	0	3	1	0	0	0	0	45	10
Norwich City	1981–82	Second Division	2	0	0	0	0	0	0	0	0	0	2	0
Norwich City	Total		42	9	2	0	3	1	0	0	0	0	47	10
Career total			474	152	35	11	36	13	10	4	1	0	559	181

== Managerial statistics ==
Team	From	To	Record				
Team	From	To	G	W	D	L	Win %
Oldham Athletic	14 July 1982	10 November 1994	615	227	166	222	36.91
Everton	10 November 1994	27 March 1997	118	47	36	35	39.83
Manchester City	18 February 1998	21 May 2001	172	74	47	51	43.02
Ipswich Town	28 October 2002	11 May 2006	189	81	48	60	42.86
Oldham Athletic	15 March 2009	8 May 2009	9	1	4	4	11.11
Everton (joint caretaker)	12 May 2016	15 May 2016	1	1	0	0	100.00
Career total			1,104	431	301	372	39.04

== Honours ==
=== Player ===
Everton

- Football League First Division: 1969–70
- FA Charity Shield: 1970
- FA Cup runner-up: 1967–68

Manchester City

- Football League Cup: 1975–76

=== Manager ===
Oldham Athletic

- Football League Second Division: 1990–91
- Football League Cup runner-up: 1989–90

Everton

- FA Cup: 1994–95
- FA Charity Shield: 1995

Manchester City

- Football League First Division runner-up: 1999–2000
- Football League Second Division play-offs: 1999

Individual

- Premier League Manager of the Month: February 1994
- Football League Championship Manager of the Month: November 2004

== See also ==
- List of football managers with the most matches
