= 1985–86 Everton F.C. season =

English football club season

Everton
1985–86 season
- Chairman: Philip Carter
- Manager: Howard Kendall
- Ground: Goodison Park
- First Division: 2nd
- FA Cup: Runners-up
- League Cup: Quarter-Final
- Football League Super Cup: Runners-up (continued into 1986–87 season)
- FA Charity Shield: Winners
- Top goalscorer: League: Gary Lineker (30); All: Gary Lineker (40)
- Highest home attendance: 51,509 vs. Liverpool (21 September 1985)
- Lowest home attendance: 10,329 vs. Norwich City (2 October 1985)
Home colours

During the 1985–86 English football season, Everton F.C. competed in the Football League First Division. They finished 2nd in the table with 86 points.

== Squad ==
Note: Flags indicate national team as defined under FIFA eligibility rules; some limited exceptions apply. Players may hold more than one non-FIFA nationality.

Pos.	Nation	Player
GK	ENG	Bobby Mimms
GK	WAL	Neville Southall
GK	NIR	Pat Jennings
GK	ENG	Mike Stowell
DF	ENG	Alan Harper
DF	ENG	Derek Mountfield
DF	ENG	Peter Billing
DF	ENG	Neil Pointon
DF	WAL	Kevin Ratcliffe
DF	ENG	Gary Stevens
DF	WAL	Pat Van Den Hauwe

Pos.	Nation	Player
DF	ENG	Dave Watson
DF	ENG	John Bailey
MF	ENG	Paul Bracewell
MF	ENG	Peter Reid
MF	IRL	Kevin Sheedy
MF	ENG	Trevor Steven
MF	ENG	Kevin Richardson
MF	ENG	Warren Aspinall
FW	ENG	Adrian Heath
FW	ENG	Gary Lineker
FW	ENG	Ian Marshall
FW	SCO	Graeme Sharp
FW	ENG	Paul Wilkinson

== Competitions ==
Win	Draw	Loss

=== FA Charity Shield ===
Date	Opponent	Venue	Result	Attendance	Goalscorers
10 August 1985	Manchester United	N	2–0	82,000	Steven 27', Heath 83'

=== Football League Division One ===
==== League Table ====
Pos	Team	Pld	W	D	L	GF	GA	GD	Pts	Qualification or relegation
1	Liverpool (C)	42	26	10	6	89	37	+52	88	Disqualified from the European Cup
2	Everton (Note: Since the FA Cup winners, Liverpool, would have instead qualified for the European Cup, qualification would have instead been passed down to runners-up Everton.)	42	26	8	8	87	41	+46	86	Disqualified from the European Cup Winners' Cup
3	West Ham United	42	26	6	10	74	40	+34	84	Disqualified from the UEFA Cup
4	Manchester United	42	22	10	10	70	36	+34	76	Disqualified from the UEFA Cup
5	Sheffield Wednesday (Note: Since Everton would have instead qualified for the European Cup Winners' Cup, UEFA Cup qualification would have been passed down to Sheffield Wednesday.)	42	21	10	11	63	54	+9	73	Disqualified from the UEFA Cup

Source: World Football
Rules for classification: 1) Points; 2) Goal difference; 3) Goals scored
(C) Champions

==== Results by round ====
Round	1	2	3	4	5	6	7	8	9	10	11	12	13	14	15	16	17	18	19	20	21	22	23	24	25	26	27	28	29	30	31	32	33	34	35	36	37	38	39	40	41	42
Ground	A	H	H	A	H	A	A	H	H	A	H	A	A	H	H	A	H	A	H	A	H	A	A	H	H	A	A	H	H	A	H	H	A	H	H	A	A	H	A	A	H	A
Result	L	W	D	W	W	W	L	W	L	D	W	L	W	D	L	W	W	D	W	W	L	W	W	W	D	W	W	W	W	W	W	D	L	W	D	W	W	W	D	L	W	W
Position	19	4	11	6	5	2	4	2	6	5	4	6	6	4	7	6	6	6	6	6	6	6	5	3	3	2	2	1	1	1	1	1	1	1	2	2	1	2	2	2	3	2

Source: https://www.11v11.com/teams/nottingham-forest/tab/matches/season/1985/
A = Away; H = Home; W = Win; D = Draw; L = Lost; = Champions, Disqualified to 1986–87 European Cup; = Disqualified to 1986–87 UEFA Cup; = Relegated to Division Two

On 2 June 1985, English teams were banned by UEFA from its competitions from the 1985–86 season until the 1989–90 season because of the Heysel Disaster in 1985, involving Liverpool fans.

==== Matches ====
17 August 1985 1	Leicester City	3–1	Everton	Leicester
	Bright 61'; Bright 77'		24' Mountfield	Stadium: Filbert Street; Attendance: 16,932

20 August 1985 2	Everton	2–0	West Bromwich Albion	Walton
	Heath 64', 82'			Stadium: Goodison Park; Attendance: 26,788

24 August 1985 3	Everton	1–1	Coventry City	Walton
	Sharp 85'		43' Gibson	Stadium: Goodison Park; Attendance: 27,691

26 August 1985 4	Tottenham Hotspur	0–1	Everton	Tottenham
			Lineker	Stadium: White Hart Lane; Attendance: 29,720

31 August 1985 5	Everton	4–1	Birmingham City	Walton
	Lineker 11', 22', 85'; Steven 79' (pen.)		25' Kennedy	Stadium: Goodison Park; Attendance: 28,066

3 September 1985 6	Sheffield Wednesday	1–5	Everton	Sheffield
	Goal		Mountfield, Lineker; Steven; Heath	Stadium: Hillsborough; Attendance: 30,065

7 September 1985 7	Queens Park Rangers	3–0	Everton	Shepherd's Bush
	Bannister 29', 55'; Byrne 42'			Stadium: Loftus Road; Attendance: 16,544

14 September 1985 8	Everton	2–0	Luton Town	Walton
	Sheedy 44'; Sharp 86'			Stadium: Goodison Park; Attendance: 26,419

21 September 1985 9	Everton	2–3	Liverpool	Walton
	Sharp 51'; Lineker 82'		1' Dalglish; 16' Rush; 43' McMahon	Stadium: Goodison Park; Attendance: 51,509

28 September 1985 10	Aston Villa	0–0	Everton	Birmingham
				Stadium: Villa Park; Attendance: 22,048

5 October 1985 11	Everton	2–0	Oxford United	Walton
	Sharp 43'; Bracewell 89'			Stadium: Goodison Park; Attendance: 24,553

12 October 1985 12	Chelsea	2–1	Everton	Fulham
	Dixon 4'; Speedie 40'		41'Sheedy	Stadium: Stamford Bridge; Attendance: 27,634

19 October 1985 13	Everton	4–1	Watford	Walton
	Heath 45', 60'; Sharp 81'; Bracewell 67'		57' (pen.) Jackett	Stadium: Goodison Park; Attendance: 26,425

26 October 1985 14	Manchester City	1–1	Everton	Moss Side
	Simpson 47'		35' Heath	Stadium: Maine Road; Attendance: 28,807

2 November 1985 15	West Ham United	2–1	Everton	Upton Park
	McAvennie 75'; Mc Avennie 83'		60' Steven	Stadium: Boleyn Ground; Attendance: 23,844

9 November 1985 16	Everton	6–1	Arsenal	Walton
	Lineker 19', 38' Heath 50', 80'; Steven 62' (pen.); Sharp 84'		46' Nicholas	Stadium: Goodison Park; Attendance: 28,620

16 November 1985 17	Ipswich Town	3–4	Everton	Ipswich
	D'Avray 6'; Wilson 28'; Butcher 72'		42' Heath; 47' Sharp; 60' Sheedy; 78' (pen.) Steven	Stadium: Portman Road; Attendance: 13,910

23 November 1985 18	Everton	1–1	Nottingham Forest	Walton
	Bracewell 76'		70' Clough	Stadium: Goodison Park; Attendance: 27,860

30 November 1985 19	Southampton	2–3	Everton	Southampton
	Cockerill 1'; Moran 70'		29' Lineker; 75' Heath; 83' Steven	Stadium: The Dell; Attendance: 16,917

7 December 1985 20	West Browmwich Albion	0–3	Everton	West Bromwich
			3' Sheedy; 15' Van Den Hauwe; 52' Lineker	Stadium: The Hawthorns; Attendance: 12,206

14 December 1985 21	Everton	1–2	Leicester City	Walton
	Richardson 26'		59' (pen.) McAllister; 77' Smith	Stadium: Goodison Park; Attendance: 23,347

21 December 1985 22	Coventry City	1–3	Everton	Coventry
	Gibson 60'		56', 86' Lineker; 62'Sharp	Stadium: Highfield Road; Attendance: 11,059

26 December 1985 23	Everton	3–1	Manchester United	Walton
	Sharp 19' Lineker 24', 85'		51' (o.g.) Stevens	Stadium: Goodison Park; Attendance: 42,551

28 December 1985 24	Everton	3–1	Sheffield Wednesday	Walton
	Stevens; Lineker		Goal	Stadium: Goodison Park; Attendance: 41,536

1 January 1986 25	Newcastle United	2–2	Everton	Newcastle-upon-Tyne
	Goal		Steven; Sharp (pen)	Stadium: St. James' Park; Attendance: 27,820

11 January 1986 26	Everton	4–3	Queens Park Rangers	Walton
	Sharp 44' (pen.), 67'; Lineker 55'; Wilkinson 56'		Bannister 12'; Bannister 87'; Byrne 25'	Stadium: Goodison Park; Attendance: 26,015

18 January 1986 27	Birmingham City	0–2	Everton	Birmingham
			36', 46'Lineker	Attendance: 10,502

1 February 1986 28	Everton	1–0	Tottenham Hotspur	Walton
	Reid 82'			Stadium: Goodison Park; Attendance: 33,178

11 February 1986 29	Everton	4–0	Manchester City	Walton
	Lineker,, Sharp			Stadium: Goodison Park; Attendance: 30,006

22 February 1986 30	Liverpool	0–2	Everton	Liverpool
			Ratcliffe; Lineker	Stadium: Anfield; Attendance: 45,445

1 March 1986 31	Everton	2–0	Aston Villa	Walton
	Lineker 43'; Sharp 90'			Stadium: Goodison Park; Attendance: 32,133

16 March 1986 32	Everton	1–1	Chelsea	Walton
	Sheedy 86'		12' Murphy	Stadium: Goodison Park; Attendance: 30,145

22 March 1986 33	Luton Town	2–1	Everton	Luton
	Foster 82'; Newell 86'		46'Richardson	Stadium: Kenilworth Road; Attendance: 10,949

29 March 1986 34	Everton	1–0	Newcastle United	Walton
	Richardson 29'			Stadium: Goodison Park; Attendance: 41,116

31 March 1986 35	Manchester United	0–0	Everton	Greater Manchester
				Stadium: Old Trafford; Attendance: 51,189

12 April 1986 36	Arsenal	0–1	Everton	Islington
			Heath	Stadium: Highbury; Attendance: 28,251

15 April 1986 37	Watford	0–2	Everton	Watford
			43' Lineker; 90' Sharp	Attendance: 18,960

19 April 1986 38	Everton	1–0	Ipswich Town	Walton
	Sharp 64'			Stadium: Goodison Park; Attendance: 39,055

26 April 1986 39	Nottingham Forest	0–0	Everton	West Bridgford
				Stadium: City Ground; Attendance: 30,171

30 April 1986 40	Oxford United	1–0	Everton	Oxford
				Stadium: Manor Ground; Attendance: 13,939

3 May 1986 41	Everton	6–1	Southampton	Walton
	Mountfield 10'; Steven 29'; Lineker 31', 34', 63'; Sharp 55'		59' Puckett	Stadium: Goodison Park; Attendance: 33,057

5 May 1986 42	Everton	3–1	West Ham United	Walton
	Lineker 38', 47'; Steven Steven 72' (pen.)		90' Cottee	Stadium: Goodison Park; Attendance: 40,073

=== FA Cup ===
Round	Date	Opponent	Venue	Result	Attendance	Goalscorers
3	5 January 1986	Exeter City	H	1–0	22,726	Stevens 80'
4	25 January 1986	Blackburn Rovers	H	3–1	41,381	Van Den Hauwe 13', Lineker 39', 82'
5	4 March 1986	Tottenham Hotspur	A	2–1	23,338	Heath 51', Lineker 73'
6	8 March 1986	Luton Town	A	2–2	15,529	Sharp 65', Heath 77'
6:R	12 March 1986	Luton Town	H	1–0	44,264	Lineker 16'
SF	5 April 1986	Sheffield Wednesday	N	2–1 (aet)	47,711	Harper 48', Sharp 97'
F	10 May 1986	Liverpool	N	1–3	98,000	Lineker 27'

=== League Cup ===
Round	Date	Opponent	Venue	Result	Attendance	Goalscorers
2:1	25 September 1985	Bournemouth	H	3–2	13,930	Lineker 22', Marshall 35', Heffernan 54' (o.g.)
2:2	8 October 1985	Bournemouth	A	2–0 (agg 5–2)	8,081	Lineker 53', Richardson 64'
3	29 October 1985	Shrewsbury Town	A	4–1	10,246	Sharp 22', Hughes 47',(o.g.), Sheedy 55', Heath 89'
4	26 November 1985	Chelsea	A	2–2	27,544	Sheedy 2', Bracewell 13'
4:R	10 December 1985	Chelsea	H	1–2	26,373	Lineker 9'

=== Football League Super Cup/Screen Sport Super Cup ===
Round	Date	Opponent	Venue	Result	Attendance	Goalscorers
GS	18 September 1985	Manchester United	A	4–2	33,859	Lineker 44', Sharp 79', Sheedy 24', 53'
GS	2 October 1985	Norwich City	H	1–0	10,329	Lineker 70'
GS	23 October 1985	Norwich City	A	0–1	12,196	
GS	4 December 1985	Manchester United	H	1–0	20,542	Stapleton 85' (o.g.)
SF:1	5 February 1986	Tottenham Hotspur	A	0–0	7,548	
SF:2	19 March 1986	Tottenham Hotspur	H	3–1 (a.e.t.) (agg 3–1)	12,008	Heath 77', Mountfield 91', Sharp 112'
F:1	16 September 1986	Liverpool	A	1–3	20,660	Sheedy 29'
F:2	30 September 1986	Liverpool	H	1–4 (agg 2–7)	26,068	Sharp 88' (pen)
