= 1986–87 Everton F.C. season =

English football club season

Everton
1986–87 season
- Chairman: Philip Carter
- Manager: Howard Kendall
- Ground: Goodison Park
- First Division: 1st (Champions)
- FA Cup: Fifth Round
- League Cup: Quarter-Final
- Full Members' Cup: Quarter-Final
- FA Charity Shield: Winners
- Top goalscorer: League: Trevor Steven (14); All: Adrian Heath, Kevin Sheedy, Trevor Steven (16)
- Highest home attendance: 53,323 vs. Liverpool (21 January 1987)
- Lowest home attendance: 7,530 vs. Newcastle United (3 December 1986)

During the 1986–87 English football season, Everton F.C. competed in the Football League First Division. They finished 1st in the table with 86 points. The Toffees advanced to the 5th round of the FA Cup, losing to Wimbledon, and to the quarter finals of the League Cup, losing to Liverpool.

== Final league table ==
Pos	Team	Pld	W	D	L	GF	GA	GD	Pts	Qualification or relegation
1	Everton (C)	42	26	8	8	76	31	+45	86	Disqualified from the European Cup
2	Liverpool	42	23	8	11	72	42	+30	77	Disqualified from the UEFA Cup
3	Tottenham Hotspur	42	21	8	13	68	43	+25	71	Disqualified from the UEFA Cup
4	Arsenal (Note: Arsenal would have qualified as League Cup winners.)	42	20	10	12	58	35	+23	70	Disqualified from the UEFA Cup
5	Norwich City	42	17	17	8	53	51	+2	68	

Source: World Football
Rules for classification: 1) Points; 2) Goal difference; 3) Goals scored
(C) Champions

== Results ==
Win	Draw	Loss

=== Football League First Division ===
Date	Opponent	Venue	Result	Attendance	Scorers
23 August 1986	Nottingham Forest	H	2–0	35,198	Sheedy 27', 66'
25 August 1986	Sheffield Wednesday	A	2–2	33,007	Sharp 57', Langley 69'
30 August 1986	Coventry City	A	1–1	13,504	Marshall 78'
2 September 1986	Oxford United	H	3–1	26,018	Steven 51', (pen), Harper 70', Langley 82'
6 September 1986	Queens Park Rangers	H	0–0	30,173	
13 September 1986	Wimbledon	A	2–1	11,708	Sheedy 4', Sharp 56'
21 September 1986	Manchester United	H	3–1	25,843	Sharp 6', Sheedy 45', Heath 89'
27 September 1986	Tottenham Hotspur	A	0–2	28,007	
4 October 1986	Arsenal	H	0–1	30,007	
11 October 1986	Charlton Athletic	A	2–3	10,564	Sheedy 30', 57'
18 October 1986	Southampton	A	2–0	18,009	Steven 79', (pen), Wilkinson 82'
25 October 1986	Watford	H	3–2	28,577	Mountfield 54', 82', Steven 62', (pen)
2 November 1986	West Ham United	A	0–1	19,094	
8 November 1986	Chelsea	H	2–2	29,727	Steven 26', (pen), Sheedy 66'
15 November 1986	Leicester City	A	2–0	13,450	Heath 26', Sheedy 66'
23 November 1986	Liverpool	H	0–0	48,247	
29 November 1986	Manchester City	A	3–1	27,097	Heath 4', 86', Power 67'
6 December 1986	Norwich City	H	4–0	26,476	Power 18', Steven 28', (pen), Pointon 78', Heath 89'
13 December 1986	Luton Town	A	0–1	11,151	
20 December 1986	Wimbledon	H	3–0	25,553	Steven 24', Sheedy 28', Heath 60'
26 December 1986	Newcastle United	A	4–0	47,024	Steven 54', 59', Power 23', Heath 83'
28 December 1986	Leicester City	H	5–1	39,730	Heath 15', 74', Wilkinson 21', O'Neil (o.g.) 47', Sheedy 87'
1 January 1987	Aston Villa	H	3–0	40,203	Harper 47', Steven 57', Sheedy 79',
3 January 1987	Queens Park Rangers	A	1–0	19,287	Sharp 66'
17 January 1987	Sheffield Wednesday	H	2–0	33,011	Steven 15' (pen), Watson 32'
25 January 1987	Nottingham Forest	A	0–1	17,009	
7 February 1987	Coventry City	H	3–1	30,402	Stevens 44', Steven 52', Heath 66'
14 February 1987	Oxford United	A	1–1	11,878	Wilkinson 88'
28 February 1987	Manchester United	A	0–0	47,421	
8 March 1987	Watford	A	1–2	14,014	Heath 36'
14 March 1987	Southampton	H	3–0	26,564	Wright (o.g.) 12', Power 40', Watson 54'
21 March 1987	Charlton Athletic	H	2–1	27,291	Steven 43', (pen), Stevens 83'
28 March 1987	Arsenal	A	1–0	36,218	Clarke 22'
4 April 1987	Chelsea	A	2–1	21,914	McLaughlin 23', (o.g.), Harper 77'
11 April 1987	West Ham United	H	4–0	35,731	Clarke 19', Reid 22', Stevens 32', Watson 38'
18 April 1987	Aston Villa	A	1–0	31,218	Sheedy 53'
20 April 1987	Newcastle United	H	3–0	43,576	Clarke 48', 82', 90'
25 April 1987	Liverpool	A	1–3	44,827	Sheedy 16'
2 May 1987	Manchester City	H	0–0	37,541	
4 May 1987	Norwich City	A	1–0	23,489	Van Den Hauwe 1'
9 May 1987	Luton Town	H	3–1	44,092	Steven 52', 55', (2 pens), Sharp 61'
11 May 1987	Tottenham Hotspur	H	1–0	28,287	Mountfield 80'

=== FA Cup ===
Round	Date	Opponent	Venue	Result	Attendance	Goalscorers
3	10 January 1987	Southampton	A	2–1	32,320	Sharp 36', 67'
4	31 January 1987	Bradford City	A	1–0	15,519	Snodin 51'
5	22 February 1987	Wimbledon	A	1–3	9,924	Wilkinson 4'

=== League Cup ===
Round	Date	Opponent	Venue	Result	Attendance	Goalscorers
2:1	24 September 1986	Newport County	H	4–0	11,957	Wilkinson 72', 80', Langley 7', Heath 61'
2:2	7 October 1986	Newport County	A	5–1 (agg 9–1)	7,172	Wilkinson 3', 42', 87', Sharp 20', Mullen (o.g.) 29'
3	28 October 1986	Sheffield Wednesday	A	4–0	24,638	Wilkinson 2', 79', Heath 11', Mountfied 77'
4	19 November 1986	Norwich City	A	4–1	17,988	Sheedy 22', Sharp 37', Steven 79', (pen), Heath 85'
QF	21 January 1987	Liverpool	H	0–1	53,323	

=== Full Members' Cup ===
Round	Date	Opponent	Venue	Result	Attendance	Goalscorers
4	3 December 1986	Newcastle United	H	5–2	7,530	Sharp 6', 21', 39', (pen) Heath 76', Sheedy 4'
QF	3 March 1987	Charlton Athletic	H	2–2	7,914	Steven 12', Wilkinson 59'

=== FA Charity Shield ===
Date	Opponent	Venue	Result	Attendance	Goalscorers
16 August 1986	Liverpool	N	1–1	88,231	Heath 80'

== Squad ==
Note: Flags indicate national team as defined under FIFA eligibility rules; some limited exceptions apply. Players may hold more than one non-FIFA nationality.

No.	Pos.	Nation	Player
—	DF	ENG	Neil Adams
—	MF	ENG	Warren Aspinall
—	MF	ENG	Paul Bracewell
—	FW	ENG	Wayne Clarke
—	DF	ENG	Alan Harper
—	FW	ENG	Adrian Heath
—	MF	ENG	Kevin Langley
—	FW	ENG	Ian Marshall
—	GK	ENG	Bobby Mimms
—	DF	ENG	Derek Mountfield
—	DF	ENG	Neil Pointon
—	DF	ENG	Paul Power
—	DF	WAL	Kevin Ratcliffe
—	MF	ENG	Peter Reid

No.	Pos.	Nation	Player
—	FW	SCO	Graeme Sharp
—	MF	IRL	Kevin Sheedy
—	DF	ENG	Ian Snodin
—	GK	WAL	Neville Southall
—	MF	ENG	Trevor Steven
—	DF	ENG	Gary Stevens
—	DF	WAL	Pat Van Den Hauwe
—	DF	ENG	Dave Watson
—	GK	ENG	Mike Stowell
—	FW	ENG	Paul Wilkinson
