= 1984–85 Everton F.C. season =

Everton
1984–85 season
- Chairman: Philip Carter
- Manager: Howard Kendall
- First Division: 1st (champions)
- FA Cup: Runners-up
- League Cup: Fourth Round
- FA Charity Shield: Winners
- European Cup Winners' Cup: Winners
- Top goalscorer: League: Graeme Sharp (21); All: Graeme Sharp (27)
- Highest home attendance: 51,045 v Liverpool (23 May 1985)
- Lowest home attendance: 16,277 v University College Dublin (3 October 1984)
- Average home league attendance: 32,131
Home colours

During the 1984–85 English football season, Everton F.C. competed in the Football League First Division and finished as champions for the first time in 15 years, also winning the European Cup Winners' Cup.

== Season summary ==
Everton enjoyed a hugely successful season, winning the First Division with 90 points (13 more than runners-up Liverpool) and the Cup Winners' Cup with a 3–1 win over Rapid Vienna. In recognition of these achievements, Howard Kendall was voted Manager of the Year while goalkeeper Neville Southall and midfielder Peter Reid picked up the FWA Footballer of the Year and PFA Players' Player of the Year awards respectively. Domestically, the only downside to the season was the FA Cup Final defeat to Manchester United which prevented Kendall's team from completing a domestic double and continental treble. Further disappointment would follow when UEFA's blanket ban on English clubs following the Heysel stadium disaster denied Everton the opportunity to compete in the following season's European Cup.

Everton had ended the 1983–84 campaign by beating Watford 2–0 in the FA Cup final to claim their first piece of silverware for 14 years. Kendall saw little need to make major alterations to his squad although midfielder Paul Bracewell was a notable acquisition, signed for £425,000 from Sunderland, and another was made a few weeks into the new season when Everton paid Birmingham City £100,000 for Pat Van Den Hauwe who quickly made the left-back spot his own. The defence was augmented by right-back Gary Stevens and the centre-back pairing of Derek Mountfield and skipper Kevin Ratcliffe, with Southall by now established as first-choice goalkeeper. Reid and Bracewell were flanked in midfield by Trevor Steven and Kevin Sheedy while Graeme Sharp and Andy Gray ended the season as the regular forward line after a serious knee injury suffered against Sheffield Wednesday ended Adrian Heath's season prematurely.

Although the season opened with victory over Liverpool in the Charity Shield, Everton's league campaign began poorly with a 4–1 thrashing by Tottenham Hotspur at Goodison Park followed two days later by a 2–1 defeat at West Bromwich Albion. However, a Kevin Richardson goal gave them victory at Chelsea on the last day of August and they went through September unbeaten, notching up further away wins at Newcastle United and Watford, although three home matches produced only a narrow win over Coventry City and two draws.

October began with defeat at Arsenal but Everton then found their best form with successive victories over Aston Villa, Liverpool and Manchester United. Sharp's wonder goal clinched their first win at Anfield since the 1969-70 championship season and they were arguably even more impressive in beating Ron Atkinson's United the following week. Sheedy (twice), Heath, Stevens and Sharp scored in a 5–0 win that in no way flattered Everton. As if to prove a point, they went to Old Trafford three days later and beat United again, this time in the third round of the Milk Cup.

A 3–0 win over Leicester City saw Everton go top of the league and further victories over West Ham United and Stoke City cemented their position. However, a shock home defeat by Grimsby Town in the Milk Cup triggered a dip in form that saw Everton win only once in six matches and a 4–3 defeat by Chelsea at Goodison just before Christmas saw them surrender the leadership to Tottenham.

Thereafter, Everton were virtually unstoppable. A 2–1 win at Sunderland on Boxing Day began an unbeaten run of 28 matches which saw them collect 50 out of a possible 54 league points and reach two cup finals along the way. They reclaimed top spot in January by beating Newcastle 4–0 and victory at Tottenham at the start of April opened up a four-point lead with games in hand on their closest challengers. A 2–0 win over Queens Park Rangers on 6 May secured the title with five league matches still to play.

The Cup Winners' Cup campaign began with a surprisingly tight aggregate win over University College Dublin but Everton breezed past Inter Bratislava and Fortuna Sittard to set up a semi-final against Bayern Munich. After a goalless first leg in West Germany, they fell behind to a Dieter Hoeness goal at Goodison but roared back to reach the final thanks to goals from Sharp, Gray and Steven. Rapid Vienna were no match in Rotterdam's Feyenoord Stadium and goals from Gray, Steven and Sheedy clinched Everton's first ever European trophy.

In the FA Cup, Everton beat Leeds United, Doncaster Rovers and non-league Telford United without too much difficulty but needed a late Mountfield equaliser in the quarter-final to take Ipswich Town to a replay which they won courtesy of a Sharp penalty. In the semi-final against Luton Town, they were again trailing with time running out when Sheedy equalised with a free kick, and Mountfield headed the winner near the end of extra time.

Ultimately, the final against Manchester United - played just three days after the Cup Winners' Cup final - proved a match too far and Everton went down to a single Norman Whiteside goal in extra time. It could not take the shine off what is regarded by many as the greatest season ever in the history of the club.

== Squad ==
Note: Flags indicate national team as defined under FIFA eligibility rules; some limited exceptions apply. Players may hold more than one non-FIFA nationality.

| Pos. | Nation | Player |
|---|---|---|
| GK | ENG | Jim Arnold |
| GK | WAL | Neville Southall |
| GK | ENG | Bobby Mimms |
| DF | ENG | Ian Atkins |
| DF | ENG | John Bailey |
| DF | ENG | Alan Harper |
| DF | ENG | Darren Hughes |
| DF | ENG | Derek Mountfield |
| DF | ENG | Darren Oldroyd |
| DF | WAL | Kevin Ratcliffe (captain) |
| DF | ENG | Gary Stevens |
| DF | WAL | Pat Van Den Hauwe |
| MF | ENG | Paul Bracewell |
| MF | ENG | Terry Curran |

| Pos. | Nation | Player |
|---|---|---|
| MF | ENG | Jason Danskin |
| MF | ENG | John Morrissey |
| MF | ENG | Peter Reid |
| MF | ENG | Kevin Richardson |
| MF | ENG | Neill Rimmer |
| MF | IRL | Kevin Sheedy |
| MF | ENG | Trevor Steven |
| MF | ENG | Derek Walsh |
| MF | ENG | Andy King |
| FW | SCO | Andy Gray |
| FW | ENG | Adrian Heath |
| FW | SCO | Graeme Sharp |
| FW | ENG | Robbie Wakenshaw |
| FW | ENG | Paul Wilkinson |

== Transfers ==
=== In ===
- Paul Bracewell - Sunderland, £425,000, July 1984
- Pat Van Den Hauwe - Birmingham City, £100,000, August 1984
- Ian Atkins - Sunderland, £100,000, August 1984
- Paul Wilkinson - Grimsby Town, £250,000, March 1985
- Bobby Mimms - Rotherham United, £175,000 March 1985

=== Out ===
- Mark Higgins - retired, July 1984
- Ian Bishop - Carlisle United, July 1984
- Alan Irvine - Crystal Palace, July 1984
- Andy King - Wolverhampton Wanderers, January 1985
- Ian Macowat - Gillingham, January 1985
- Stuart Rimmer - Chester City, January 1985

== Results ==
=== Charity Shield ===
| Date | Opponents | H / A | Result F–A | Scorers | Attendance |
|---|---|---|---|---|---|
| 18 August 1984 | Liverpool | N | 1–0 | Grobbelaar 56' (o.g.) | 100,000 |

=== First Division ===
| Date | Opponents | H / A | Result F–A | Scorers | Attendance |
|---|---|---|---|---|---|
| 25 August 1984 | Tottenham Hotspur | H | 1–4 | Heath 16' (pen.) | 35,630 |
| 27 August 1984 | West Bromwich Albion | A | 1–2 | Heath 89' (pen.) | 13,464 |
| 31 August 1984 | Chelsea | A | 1–0 | Richardson 57' | 17,734 |
| 4 September 1984 | Ipswich Town | H | 1–1 | Heath 78' | 22,314 |
| 8 September 1984 | Coventry City | H | 2–1 | Steven 72', Sharp 81' | 20,013 |
| 15 September 1984 | Newcastle United | A | 3–2 | Sheedy 25', Steven 52', Gray 88' | 26,944 |
| 22 September 1984 | Southampton | H | 2–2 | Mountfield 5', Sharp 9' | 22,354 |
| 29 September 1984 | Watford | A | 5–4 | Steven 33', Heath 34', 45', Mountfield 61', Sharp 72' | 18,335 |
| 6 October 1984 | Arsenal | A | 0–1 | | 37,049 |
| 13 October 1984 | Aston Villa | H | 2–1 | Sharp 26', Heath 74' | 25,089 |
| 20 October 1984 | Liverpool | A | 1–0 | Sharp 48' | 45,545 |
| 27 October 1984 | Manchester United | H | 5–0 | Sheedy 5', 24', Heath 35', Stevens 81', Sharp 86' | 40,742 |
| 3 November 1984 | Leicester City | H | 3–0 | Steven 55', Sheedy 57', Heath 79' | 27,784 |
| 10 November 1984 | West Ham United | A | 1–0 | Heath 78' | 24,089 |
| 17 November 1984 | Stoke City | H | 4–0 | Heath 28', 34', Reid 69', Steven 73' | 26,705 |
| 24 November 1984 | Norwich City | A | 2–4 | Sharp 27', Sheedy 50' | 16,925 |
| 1 December 1984 | Sheffield Wednesday | H | 1–1 | Sharp 29' (pen.) | 35,440 |
| 8 December 1984 | Queens Park Rangers | A | 0–0 | | 14,338 |
| 15 December 1984 | Nottingham Forest | H | 5–0 | Sharp 20', 76', Sheedy 32', Steven 43', Reid 50' | 22,487 |
| 22 December 1984 | Chelsea | H | 3–4 | Bracewell 35', Sharp 69', 89' (2 pens) | 29,887 |
| 26 December 1984 | Sunderland | A | 2–1 | Mountfield 12', 19' | 19,714 |
| 29 December 1984 | Ipswich Town | A | 2–0 | Sharp 61', 86' | 16,045 |
| 1 January 1985 | Luton Town | H | 2–1 | Steven 11', 69' | 31,682 |
| 12 January 1985 | Newcastle United | H | 4–0 | Sharp 17', Mountfield 32', Sheedy 62', 86' | 32,156 |
| 2 February 1985 | Watford | H | 4–0 | Stevens 56', 62', Sheedy 69', Steven 77' | 34,026 |
| 23 February 1985 | Leicester City | A | 2–1 | Gray 66', 82' | 17,345 |
| 2 March 1985 | Manchester United | A | 1–1 | Mountfield 41' | 51,150 |
| 16 March 1985 | Aston Villa | A | 1–1 | Richardson 42' | 22,625 |
| 23 March 1985 | Arsenal | H | 2–0 | Gray 27', Sharp 89' | 36,387 |
| 30 March 1985 | Southampton | A | 2–1 | Richardson 48', 51' | 18,754 |
| 3 April 1985 | Tottenham Hotspur | A | 2–1 | Gray 9', Steven 62' | 48,108 |
| 6 April 1985 | Sunderland | H | 4–1 | Gray 34', 37', Steven 50', Sharp 68' | 35,978 |
| 16 April 1985 | West Bromwich Albion | H | 4–1 | Atkins 3', Sharp 26', 78', (pen), Sheedy 54' | 29,750 |
| 20 April 1985 | Stoke City | A | 2–0 | Sharp 23', Sheedy 46' | 18,258 |
| 27 April 1985 | Norwich City | H | 3–0 | Mountfield 42', Steven 46', Bracewell 56' | 32,085 |
| 4 May 1985 | Sheffield Wednesday | A | 1–0 | Gray 26' | 37,381 |
| 6 May 1985 | Queens Park Rangers | H | 2–0 | Mountfield 26', Sharp 82' | 50,514 |
| 8 May 1985 | West Ham United | H | 3–0 | Gray 12', Mountfield 43', 78' | 32,657 |
| 11 May 1985 | Nottingham Forest | A | 0–1 | | 18,784 |
| 23 May 1985 | Liverpool | H | 1–0 | Wilkinson 67' | 51,045 |
| 26 May 1985 | Coventry City | A | 1–4 | Wilkinson 42' | 21,224 |
| 28 May 1985 | Luton Town | A | 0–2 | | 11,509 |

| Pos | Club | Pld | W | D | L | GF | GA | GD | Pts |
|---|---|---|---|---|---|---|---|---|---|
| 1 | Everton | 42 | 28 | 6 | 8 | 88 | 43 | +45 | 90 |
| 2 | Liverpool | 42 | 22 | 11 | 9 | 68 | 35 | +33 | 77 |
| 3 | Tottenham Hotspur | 42 | 23 | 8 | 11 | 78 | 51 | +27 | 77 |

Pld = Matches played; W = Matches won; D = Matches drawn; L = Matches lost; GF = Goals for; GA = Goals against; GD = Goal difference; Pts = Points

=== European Cup Winners' Cup ===
| Date | Round | Opponents | H / A | Result F–A | Scorers | Attendance |
|---|---|---|---|---|---|---|
| 19 September 1984 | Round 1 First leg | (Republic of Ireland) University College Dublin | A | 0–0 | | 9,750 |
| 3 October 1984 | Round 1 Second leg | (Republic of Ireland) University College Dublin | H | 1–0 | Sharp 10' | 16,277 |
| 24 October 1984 | Round 2 First leg | (Czech Republic) Inter Bratislava | A | 1–0 | Bracewell 6' | 15,000 |
| 7 November 1984 | Round 2 Second leg | (Czech Republic) Inter Bratislava | H | 3–0 | Sharp 12', Sheedy 43', Heath 63' | 25,007 |
| 6 March 1985 | Quarter-final; First leg | (Netherlands) Fortuna Sittard | H | 3–0 | Gray 47', 74', 77' | 25,782 |
| 20 March 1985 | Quarter-final; Second leg | (Netherlands) Fortuna Sittard | A | 2–0 | Sharp 15', Reid 75' | 16,425 |
| 10 April 1985 | Semi-final; First leg | (West Germany) Bayern Munich | A | 0–0 | | 67,000 |
| 24 April 1985 | Semi-final; Second leg | (West Germany) Bayern Munich | H | 3–1 | Sharp 48', Gray 75', Steven 86' | 49,476 |
| 15 May 1985 | Final | (Austria) Rapid Vienna | N | 3–1 | Gray 57', Steven 72', Sheedy 86' | 40,000 |

=== League Cup ===
| Date | Round | Opponents | H / A | Result F–A | Scorers | Attendance |
|---|---|---|---|---|---|---|
| 26 September 1984 | Round 2 First leg | Sheffield United | A | 2–2 | Sharp 69', Mountfield 78' | 28,383 |
| 10 October 1984 | Round 2 Second leg | Sheffield United | H | 4–0 | Mountfield 6', Bracewell 56', Sharp 67', Heath 74' | 18,740 |
| 30 October 1984 | Round 3 | Manchester United | A | 2–1 | Sharp 42', (pen.), Gidman (o.g.) 84' | 50,918 |
| 20 November 1984 | Round 4 | Grimsby Town | H | 0–1 | | 26,298 |

=== FA Cup ===
| Date | Round | Opponents | H / A | Result F–A | Scorers | Attendance |
|---|---|---|---|---|---|---|
| 4 January 1985 | Round 3 | Leeds United | A | 2–0 | Sharp 40', (pen.), Sheedy 85' | 21,211 |
| 26 January 1985 | Round 4 | Doncaster Rovers | H | 2–0 | Steven 19', Stevens 33' | 37,537 |
| 16 February 1985 | Round 5 | Telford United | H | 3–0 | Reid 67', Sheedy 71', (pen.), Steven 87' | 47,402 |
| 9 March 1985 | Quarter-final | Ipswich Town | H | 2–2 | Sheedy 5', Mountfield 85' | 36,468 |
| 13 March 1985 | Quarter-final; Replay | Ipswich Town | A | 1–0 | Sharp 76' (pen.) | 27,737 |
| 13 April 1985 | Semi-final | Luton Town | N | 2–1 (a.e.t.) | Sheedy 86', Mountfield 115' | 45,289 |
| 18 May 1985 | Final | Manchester United | N | 0–1 | | 100,000 |
