= 1987–88 Everton F.C. season =

English football club season

Everton
1987–88 season
- Chairman: Philip Carter
- Manager: Colin Harvey
- Ground: Goodison Park
- First Division: 4th
- FA Cup: Fifth Round
- League Cup: Semi Final
- FA Charity Shield: Winners
- Top goalscorer: League: Graeme Sharp (13); All: Graeme Sharp (22)
- Highest home attendance: 48,270 vs. Liverpool (21 February 1988)
- Lowest home attendance: 5,204 vs. Luton Town (16 February 1988)

During the 1987–88 English football season, Everton F.C. competed in the Football League First Division. They finished 4th in the table with 70 points. The Toffees advanced to the 5th round of the FA Cup, losing to Liverpool, and to the semifinals of the League Cup, losing to Arsenal.

== Final league table ==
Pos	Team	Pld	W	D	L	GF	GA	GD	Pts	Qualification or relegation
2	Manchester United	40	23	12	5	71	38	+33	81	Qualified for the Football League Centenary Trophy and disqualified from UEFA Cup
3	Nottingham Forest	40	20	13	7	67	39	+28	73	Qualified for the Football League Centenary Trophy
4	Everton	40	19	13	8	53	27	+26	70	Qualified for the Football League Centenary Trophy
5	Queens Park Rangers	40	19	10	11	48	38	+10	67	Qualified for the Football League Centenary Trophy
6	Arsenal	40	18	12	10	58	39	+19	66	Qualified for the Football League Centenary Trophy

Source: World Football
Rules for classification: 1) Points; 2) Goal difference; 3) Goals scored

== Results ==
Win	Draw	Loss

=== Football League First Division ===
Date	Opponent	Venue	Result	Attendance	Scorers
15 August 1987	Norwich City	H	1–0	31,728	Power
18 August 1987	Wimbledon	A	1–1	7,763	Sharp
22 August 1987	Nottingham Forest	A	0–0	20,445	
29 August 1987	Sheffield Wednesday	H	4–0	29,649	Clarke 2, Steven 2 (1 pen)
2 September 1987	Queens Park Rangers	A	0–1	15,380	
5 September 1987	Tottenham Hotspur	H	0–0	32,389	
12 September 1987	Luton Town	A	1–2	8,124	Pointon
19 September 1987	Manchester United	H	2–1	38,439	Clarke 2
26 September 1987	Coventry City	H	1–2	28,153	Clarke
3 October 1987	Southampton	A	4–0	15,719	Sharp 4
10 October 1987	Chelsea	H	4–1	32,004	Sharp 2, Heath 2
17 October 1987	Newcastle United	A	1–1	20,266	Snodin
24 October 1987	Watford	H	2–0	28,501	Heath, Sharp
1 November 1987	Liverpool	A	0–2	44,760	
14 November 1987	West Ham	H	3–1	29,405	Watson, Reid, Sharp
21 November 1987	Portsmouth	A	1–0	17,724	Sharp
28 November 1987	Oxford United	H	0–0	25,443	
5 December 1987	Charlton Athletic	A	0–0	7,208	
12 December 1987	Derby County	H	3–0	26,224	Snodin, Steven (pen), Heath
19 December 1987	Arsenal	A	1–1	34,857	Watson
26 December 1987	Luton Town	H	2–0	32,242	Heath 2
28 December 1987	Manchester United	A	1–2	47,024	Watson
1 January 1988	Sheffield Wednesday	A	0–1	26,443	
3 January 1988	Nottingham Forest	H	1–0	21,680	Clarke
16 January 1988	Norwich City	A	3–0	15,750	Sharp 2, Heath
13 February 1988	Queens Park Rangers	H	2–0	24,724	Parker (og), Pointon
27 February 1988	Southampton	H	1–0	20,764	Power
5 March 1988	Newcastle United	H	1–0	25,674	Clarke
9 March 1988	Tottenham Hotspur	A	1–2	18,662	Fenwick (og)
12 March 1988	Chelsea	A	0–0	17,390	
20 March 1988	Liverpool	H	1–0	44,162	Clarke
26 March 1988	Watford	A	2–1	13,503	Sheedy, Clarke
29 March 1988	Wimbledon	H	2–2	20,351	Steven (pen), Pointon
4 April 1988	West Ham	A	0–0	21,195	
9 April 1988	Portsmouth	H	2–1	21,292	Heath, Steven
19 April 1988	Coventry City	A	2–1	15,641	Sharp, Heath
23 April 1988	Oxford United	A	1–1	7,619	Clarke
30 April 1988	Charlton Athletic	H	1–1	20,372	Steven (pen)
2 May 1988	Derby County	A	0–0	17,974	
7 May 1988	Arsenal	H	1–2	22,445	Watson

=== FA Cup ===
Round	Date	Opponent	Venue	Result	Attendance	Goalscorers
3	9 January 1988	Sheffield Wednesday	A	1–1	33,304	Reid
3 (rep)	13 January 1988	Sheffield Wednesday	H	1–1 (aet)	32,935	Sharp
3 (2nd rep)	25 January 1988	Sheffield Wednesday	H	1–1 (aet)	37,414	Steven
3 (3rd rep)	27 January 1988	Sheffield Wednesday	A	5–0	38,953	Sharp 3, Heath, Snodin
4	30 January 1988	Middlesbrough F.C.	H	1–1	36,564	Sharp
4 (rep)	3 February 1988	Middlesbrough F.C.	A	2–2 (aet)	25,235	Watson, Steven
4 (2nd rep)	9 February 1988	Middlesbrough F.C.	H	2–1	32,222	Sharp, Mowbray (og)
5	21 February 1988	Liverpool	H	0–1	48,270	

=== League Cup ===
Round	Date	Opponent	Venue	Result	Attendance	Goalscorers
2:1	22 September 1987	Rotherham	H	3–2	15,369	Snodin, Wilson, Clarke (pen)
2:2	6 October 1987	Rotherham	A	0–0 (agg 3–2)	12,995	
3	28 October 1987	Liverpool	A	1–0	44071	Stevens
4	17 November 1987	Oldham Athletic	H	2–1	23,315	Watson, Adams
QF	20 January 1988	Manchester City	H	2–0	40,014	Heath, Sharp
SF:1	7 February 1988	Arsenal	H	0–1	25,476	
SF:2	24 February 1988	Arsenal	A	1–3 (agg 1–4)	51,148	Heath

=== Full Members Cup/Simod Cup ===
Round	Date	Opponent	Venue	Result	Attendance	Goalscorers
3	16 February 1988	Luton Town	H	1–2	5,204	Power

=== FA Charity Shield ===
Date	Opponent	Venue	Result	Attendance	Goalscorers
1 August 1987	Coventry City	N	1–0	88,000	Clarke

== Squad ==
Note: Flags indicate national team as defined under FIFA eligibility rules; some limited exceptions apply. Players may hold more than one non-FIFA nationality.

No.	Pos.	Nation	Player
—	DF	ENG	Neil Adams
—	MF	ENG	Paul Bracewell
—	FW	ENG	Wayne Clarke
—	DF	ENG	Alan Harper
—	FW	ENG	Adrian Heath
—	FW	ENG	Ian Marshall
—	GK	ENG	Bobby Mimms
—	DF	ENG	Derek Mountfield
—	DF	ENG	Neil Pointon
—	DF	ENG	Paul Power
—	DF	WAL	Kevin Ratcliffe
—	MF	ENG	Peter Reid

No.	Pos.	Nation	Player
—	FW	SCO	Graeme Sharp
—	MF	IRL	Kevin Sheedy
—	DF	ENG	Ian Snodin
—	GK	WAL	Neville Southall
—	MF	ENG	Trevor Steven
—	DF	ENG	Gary Stevens
—	DF	WAL	Pat Van Den Hauwe
—	DF	ENG	Dave Watson
—	MF	SCO	Ian Wilson
—	GK	ENG	Alec Chamberlain
—	GK	ENG	Mike Stowell
