= 1983–84 Everton F.C. season =

Everton
1983–84 season
- Chairman: Philip Carter
- Manager: Howard Kendall
- First Division: 7th
- FA Cup: Winners
- League Cup: Runners-up
- Top goalscorer: League: Adrian Heath (12); All: Adrian Heath (19)
- Highest home attendance: 51,245 v Liverpool (3 March 1984)
- Lowest home attendance: 8,067 v Chesterfield (26 October 1983)
- Average home league attendance: 20,158

During the 1983–84 English football season, Everton F.C. competed in the Football League First Division and finished 7th in the table, runners-up in the League Cup and won the FA Cup for the first time in 18 years.

== Final league table ==
Pos	Team	Pld	W	D	L	GF	GA	GD	Pts	Qualification or relegation
5	Queens Park Rangers	42	22	7	13	67	37	+30	73	Qualification for the UEFA Cup first round
6	Arsenal	42	18	9	15	74	60	+14	63	
7	Everton	42	16	14	12	44	42	+2	62	Qualification for the European Cup Winners' Cup first round (Note: Everton qualified for the European Cup Winners' Cup as the 1983–84 FA Cup winners.)
8	Tottenham Hotspur	42	17	10	15	64	65	−1	61	Qualification for the UEFA Cup first round (Note: Tottenham Hotspur qualified for the UEFA Cup as the 1983–84 UEFA Cup winners.)
9	West Ham United	42	17	9	16	60	55	+5	60	

Source: World Football
Rules for classification: 1) Points; 2) Goal difference; 3) Goals scored

== First Division ==
Date	Opponents	Venue	Result	Scorers	Attendance	Report
27 August 1983	Stoke City	H	1–0	Sharp 38'	22,658	Report
29 August 1983	West Ham United	H	0–1		20,375	Report
3 September 1983	Coventry City	A	1–1	Sheedy 27'	12,532	Report
6 September 1983	Ipswich Town	A	0–3		16,543	Report
10 September 1983	West Bromwich Albion	H	0–0		15,548	Report
17 September 1983	Tottenham Hotspur	A	2–1	Reid 20', Sheedy 37'	29,125	Report
24 September 1983	Birmingham City	H	1–1	Sharp 46' (pen.)	15,253	Report
1 October 1983	Notts County	A	1–0	Reid 33'	7,949	Report
15 October 1983	Luton Town	H	0–1		14,325	Report
22 October 1983	Watford	H	1–0	Johnson 34'	13,571	Report
29 October 1983	Leicester City	A	0–2		10,953	Report
6 November 1983	Liverpool	A	0–3		40,875	Report
12 November 1983	Nottingham Forest	H	1–0	Heath 22'	17,546	Report
19 November 1983	Arsenal	A	1–2	King 41' (pen.)	24,330	Report
26 November 1983	Norwich City	H	0–2		14,106	Report
3 December 1983	Manchester United	A	1–0	Sheedy 46'	43,664	Report
10 December 1983	Aston Villa	H	1–1	Gray 90'	15,810	Report
17 December 1983	Queens Park Rangers	A	0–2		11,608	Report
26 December 1983	Sunderland	H	0–0		18,683	Report
27 December 1983	Wolverhampton Wanderers	A	0–3		12,761	Report
31 December 1983	Coventry City	H	0–0		13,659	Report
2 January 1984	Birmingham City	A	2–0	Stevens 48' King 88'	10,004	Report
14 January 1984	Stoke City	A	1–1	Heath 46'	7,945	Report
21 January 1984	Tottenham Hotspur	H	2–1	Heath 43', 78'	18,003	Report
4 February 1984	Notts County	H	4–1	Heath 26', 38', 69', Sheedy 29' (pen.)	13,016	Report
11 February 1984	West Bromwich Albion	A	1–1	Mountfield 47'	10,313	Report
25 February 1984	Watford	A	4–4	Sharp 52', 79', Gray 67', Heath 90+1'	16,982	Report
3 March 1984	Liverpool	H	1–1	Harper 85'	51,245	Report
14 March 1984	Nottingham Forest	A	0–1		13,647	Report
17 March 1984	Ipswich Town	H	1–0	Mountfield 4'	18,013	Report
20 March 1984	Leicester City	H	1–1	Richardson 30'	15,142	Report
31 March 1984	Southampton	H	1–0	Gray 39'	20,244	Report
7 April 1984	Luton Town	A	3–0	Mountfield 63', Heath 79', 89' (pen.)	9,224	Report
9 April 1984	Arsenal	H	0–0		21,174	Report
17 April 1984	Southampton	A	1–3	Richardson 58'	16,978	Report
21 April 1984	Sunderland	A	1–2	Heath 44'	15,876	Report
23 April 1984	Wolverhampton Wanderers	H	2–0	Gray 40', Steven 72'	17,185	Report
28 April 1984	Norwich City	A	1–1	Gray 44'	13,624	Report
5 May 1984	Manchester United	H	1–1	Wakenshaw 58'	28,817	Report
7 May 1984	Aston Villa	A	2–0	Richardson 67', Sharp 72'	16,792	Report
12 May 1984	Queens Park Rangers	H	3–1	Heath 38' Sharp 78', 81'	20,679	Report
14 May 1984	West Ham United	A	1–0	Richardson 15'	25,452	Report

== FA Cup ==
Date	Opponents	Venue	Result	Scorers	Attendance	Report
7 January 1984	Stoke City	A	2–0	Gray 67', Irvine 84'	16,462	Report
28 January 1984	Gillingham	H	0–0		22,380	Report
31 January 1984	Gillingham	A	0–0		15,339	Report
6 February 1984	Gillingham	A	3–0	Sheedy 27', 38', Heath 32'	15,943	Report
18 February 1984	Shrewsbury Town	H	3–0	Irvine 29', Reid 61', Griffin 86' (o.g.)	27,106	Report
10 March 1984	Notts County	A	2–1	Richardson 6', Gray 47'	19,534	Report
14 April 1984	Southampton	N	1–0 (a.e.t.)	Heath 117'	46,587	Report

Final

19 May 1984
15:00 BST

Everton	2–0	Watford
Sharp 38'; Gray 51'	Report

Wembley, London
Attendance: 100,000
Referee: John Hunting

Everton	Watford

GK	1	(Wales) Neville Southall
DF	2	(England) Gary Stevens
DF	3	(England) John Bailey
DF	4	(Wales) Kevin Ratcliffe (c)
DF	5	(England) Derek Mountfield
MF	6	(England) Peter Reid
MF	7	(England) Trevor Steven
FW	8	(England) Adrian Heath
FW	9	(Scotland) Graeme Sharp
FW	10	(Scotland) Andy Gray
MF	11	(England) Kevin Richardson
Substitute:
DF	12	(England) Alan Harper
Manager:
(England) Howard Kendall

GK	1	(England) Steve Sherwood
DF	2	(England) David Bardsley
DF	3	(England) Neil Price		(substituted off) 58'
MF	4	(England) Les Taylor (c)
DF	5	(England) Steve Terry
DF	6	(England) Lee Sinnott
MF	7	(England) Nigel Callaghan
FW	8	(Scotland) Mo Johnston
FW	9	(Scotland) George Reilly
MF	10	(Wales) Kenny Jackett
MF	11	(England) John Barnes
Substitute:
FW	12	(England) Paul Atkinson	(substituted on) 58'
Manager:
(England) Graham Taylor

Match rules

- 90 minutes
- 30 minutes of extra-time if necessary
- Replay if scores still level
- One named substitute
- Maximum of one substitution

== League Cup ==
Date	Opponents	Venue	Result	Scorers	Attendance	Report
4 October 1983	Chesterfield	A	1–0	Sharp 32'	10,713	Report
26 October 1983	Chesterfield	H	2–2	Heath 5', Steven 67'	8,067	Report
9 November 1983	Coventry City	H	2–1	Heath 79', Sharp 90'	9,080	Report
30 November 1983	West Ham United	A	2–2	Reid 2', Sheedy 55'	19,702	Report
6 December 1983	West Ham United	H	2–0 (a.e.t.)	King 95', Sheedy 116'	21,609	Report
18 January 1984	Oxford United	A	1–1	Heath 81'	14,333	Report
24 January 1984	Oxford United	H	4–1	Richardson 7', Sheedy 34', Heath 52', Sharp 90'	31,001	Report
15 February 1984	Aston Villa	H	2–0	Sheedy 28', Richardson 82'	40,006	Report
22 February 1984	Aston Villa	A	0–1		42,426	Report

Final

25 March 1984
15:00

Liverpool	0–0 (a.e.t.)	Everton
	Report

Wembley Stadium, London
Attendance: 100,000

LIVERPOOL:
GK	1	Bruce Grobbelaar
RB	2	Phil Neal
LB	3	Alan Kennedy
CB	4	Mark Lawrenson
LM	5	Ronnie Whelan
CB	6	Alan Hansen
CF	7	Kenny Dalglish
RM	8	Sammy Lee
CF	9	Ian Rush
CM	10	Craig Johnston	(substituted off) 91'
CM	11	Graeme Souness (c)
Substitute:
FW	12	Michael Robinson	(substituted on) 91'
Manager:
Joe Fagan

EVERTON:
GK	1	Neville Southall
DF	2	Gary Stevens
DF	3	John Bailey
DF	4	Kevin Ratcliffe (c)
DF	5	Derek Mountfield
MF	6	Peter Reid
MF	7	Alan Irvine
FW	8	Adrian Heath
FW	9	Graeme Sharp
FW	10	Kevin Richardson
MF	11	Kevin Sheedy
Substitute:
DF	12	Alan Harper
Manager:
Howard Kendall

MATCH RULES

- 90 minutes.
- 30 minutes of extra-time if necessary.
- Replay if scores still level.
- One named substitute.
- Maximum of one substitution.

Replay

28 March 1984
19:30

Liverpool	1–0	Everton
Souness 21'	Report

Maine Road, Manchester
Attendance: 52,089

LIVERPOOL:
GK	1	Bruce Grobbelaar
RB	2	Phil Neal
LB	3	Alan Kennedy
CB	4	Mark Lawrenson
LM	5	Ronnie Whelan
CB	6	Alan Hansen
CF	7	Kenny Dalglish
RM	8	Sammy Lee
CF	9	Ian Rush
CM	10	Craig Johnston
CM	11	Graeme Souness (c)
Substitute:
FW	12	Michael Robinson
Manager:
Joe Fagan

EVERTON:
GK	1	Neville Southall
DF	2	Gary Stevens
DF	3	John Bailey
DF	4	Kevin Ratcliffe (c)
DF	5	Derek Mountfield
MF	6	Peter Reid
MF	7	Alan Irvine (substituted off)
FW	8	Adrian Heath
FW	9	Graeme Sharp
FW	10	Kevin Richardson
MF	11	Alan Harper
Substitute:
MF	12	Andy King (substituted on)
Manager:
Howard Kendall

MATCH RULES

- 90 minutes.
- 30 minutes of extra-time if necessary.
- One named substitute.
- Maximum of one substitution.
