= 1987 FA Charity Shield =

Association football match

- The match programme cover
Coventry City	Everton
0	1
- Date: 1 August 1987
- Venue: Wembley Stadium, London
- Referee: Ray Lewis
- Attendance: 88,000
- Weather: Sunny

The 1987 FA Charity Shield (also known as the General Motors FA Charity Shield for sponsorship reasons) was the 65th Charity Shield, a football match contested by the holders of the Football League First Division and FA Cup. This edition was contested between Everton and Coventry City at Wembley Stadium on 1 August 1987. Everton had won the 1986–87 Football League while Coventry City had defeated Tottenham Hotspur in the 1987 FA Cup Final to qualify for the season opener for the first time. It was played two weeks before the new league season began. This was Everton's fourth successive appearance in the Charity Shield. The match was shown live on ITV.

The match was played in front of 88,000 spectators in sunny conditions and was refereed by Ray Lewis. Just before half-time, Trevor Steven who sprinted down the pitch and delivered a pass into the centre, over Trevor Peake, and Wayne Clarke struck the ball into the roof of the Coventry City net to give Everton a 1–0 lead. Early in the second half, David Speedie missed an opportunity to score after a pass from Greg Downs, Bobby Mimms saving his strike with his toe. In the 67th minute, Everton came close to doubling their lead but Paul Power's shot was over the Coventry City crossbar. Nick Pickering then struck the Everton crossbar with an overhead kick. In the last moments of the match, Steve Ogrizovic saved a shot from Sharp and the match ended 1–0 to Everton who won the Charity Shield for the eighth time.

== Background ==
Founded in 1908 as a successor to the Sheriff of London Charity Shield, the FA Charity Shield began as a contest between the respective champions of The Football League and the Southern League, although in 1913, it was played between an Amateurs XI and a Professionals XI. In 1921, it was contested by the league champions of the top division and FA Cup winners for the first time. (Note: The Premier League replaced the Football League First Division at the top of the English football pyramid after its inception in 1992.) The 1987 FA Charity Shield was the 65th edition of the event. (Note: As of 2021, the event is known as the FA Community Shield, having been renamed in 2002.)

Coventry City had qualified to participate in the Charity Shield after they defeated Tottenham Hotspur in the 1987 FA Cup Final, winning 3–2. Everton were eligible to play in the Charity Shield after they had ended the 1986–87 season as league champions. This was Everton's tenth appearance in the Charity Shield, and the fourth consecutive season, as well as their eighth visit to Wembley Stadium in four years. Coventry City were making their debut in the competition and playing at Wembley Stadium for the second time in their history, the first being their victory in the previous season's FA Cup. The most recent meeting between the sides was in the First Division on 7 February 1987 at Goodison Park which Everton had won 3–1 with goals from Trevor Steven, Adrian Heath and Gary Stevens, with Cyrille Regis scoring Coventry City's solitary goal.

During the off-season, Everton's manager Howard Kendall had left the club to take over at Spanish side Athletic Bilbao, with whom he was able to participate in European football competition while English clubs were banned after the Heysel Stadium disaster in 1985. He was replaced at Everton by then-coach Colin Harvey in what was his first managerial role. Coventry City's John Sillett became the sole manager after George Curtis had moved into an administrative role at the club.

Everton were without their first-choice goalkeeper Neville Southall following a knee operation, so Bobby Mimms took his place in the starting line-up. Paul Bracewell, Pat Van Den Hauwe and Ian Snodin were also out with injury and while doubt remained over Heath's fitness following an ankle injury, he started for Everton. Coventry City's side included Scottish international David Speedie who had signed for them during the previous month for £750,000 from Chelsea: he was included in the starting eleven in place of Regis who had failed to recover from a groin injury. Everton came into the Charity Shield after having defeated Swedish side Linköpings FF 4–1 with two goals from Graeme Sharp, and one each from Snodin and Ian Marshall. Coventry City adopted a 4–3–3 formation while Everton played as 4–4–2.

The match was officially referred to as the "General Motors FA Charity Shield" as part of a sponsorship deal between The Football Association and American vehicle manufacturer General Motors. It was played at Wembley Stadium, which first hosted the Shield in 1974. The referee for the match was Ray Lewis from Great Bookham in Surrey. The fixture had been brought forward by one week in order to allow the Football League Centenary match to be hosted at the national stadium, which would see a "Football League XI" play against a "Rest of the World XI", which included Diego Maradona, Gary Lineker, Michel Platini and Josimar. The Charity Shield was broadcast live in several regions on the ITV network.

Coventry City's allocation of tickets for the match was higher than the 25,000 they had received for the FA Cup Final, and the size of their support was reported at the time as setting a new record for a single club in the Charity Shield. The figure varies between sources, with The Guardian placing it at 35,000, while club historians David Brassington and Jim Brown gave the figure as 40,000 and 50,000 respectively. Brassington described it as "the largest exodus Coventry had ever experienced".

== Match ==
=== Pre-match ===
Everton had to make a change to their line-up on the morning of the match, when full-back Stevens became ill with a virus. He was replaced by Heath, while Alan Harper switched to the defence. Despite Curtis no longer being involved in day-to-day management, Coventry chose him to lead the team out on to the field before the game. This was as a result of Sillett having led them out on his own before the FA Cup Final, following an FA denial of Coventry's request for both men to lead. Sillett said that they had decided before the FA Cup game to split the honours this way, "because we were sure to win the Cup".

=== First half ===
The match kicked off around 3 p.m. on 1 August 1987 at Wembley Stadium in front of 88,000 spectators in sunny conditions. Coventry's Lloyd McGrath was penalised for a strong challenge on Heath early in the game, but the Everton free kick came to nothing when Sharp fouled goalkeeper Steve Ogrizovic. Coventry striker Dave Bennett then made a run towards the Everton goal after Peter Reid had given the ball away, but the attack ended when Nick Pickering was given offside. Speedie received headed a pass from Greg Downs towards Mimms, but was also offside. Ten minutes into the game, Harper sent a free kick deep into Coventry's penalty area which was caught by Ogrizovic. He immediately sent the ball down the field towards Speedie, but Everton's Dave Watson was able to clear the danger. Ogrizovic initiated a similar attack minutes later, when his up-field clearance was laid off by Speedie to Micky Gynn. Gynn ran towards Everton's goal and was brought down by a defender. Keith Houchen stopped playing to take a free kick, but the referee had already decided to play advantage and Coventry lost the ball. Both sides continued to attack, with Sharp hitting a shot which was too weak, and Pickering then kicking wide of the goal. The award of a corner to Everton, from which Sharp narrowly missed with a header, sparked a mass argument with the referee by Coventry's players. Both teams had started the game with full commitment, with 10 fouls recorded in the first 20 minutes.

The attacks continued, with Ogrizovic launching Coventry forward a third time, but Houchen's shot went high over the Everton crossbar after a pass from Pickering. Everton's Steven then attempted to score after Coventry full-back David Phillips had given away the ball, but Downs's tackle denied him. Everton had more of the possession in the latter part of the first half, but both sides continued to attack. Sharp made a run down the right wing, with Coventry's defence stretched, but Phillips stopped the attack with a well-timed tackle. Speedie then had another chance from an Ogrizovic clearance, but Everton captain Kevin Ratcliffe won the ball easily. Paul Power ran down the right, crossing the ball into the penalty area over Ogrizovic's head, but Pickering cleared the ball over the crossbar. Coventry then had what Coventry Evening Telegraph reporter Roger Draper called their "best move of the match", with Houchen, Pickering and Bennett all involved in the build-up, but Speedie's header went wide. Just before half-time, Heath back-heeled the ball to Steven who sprinted down the pitch and delivered a pass into the centre. Trevor Peake was unable to reach the ball as it flew over his head and Wayne Clarke was able to strike it firmly into the roof of the Coventry City net to give Everton a 1–0 lead. During the interval, Everton were forced to make a change to their team, as Kevin Sheedy had picked up an Achilles tendon injury, and Neil Pointon came on in his place.

=== Second half ===
Early in the second half, Speedie missed an opportunity to score after a pass from Downs when Mimms saved his strike with his toe. Everton's Watson then became the first player of the match to be booked after he fouled McGrath, who soon after had to be substituted with Steve Sedgley coming on to replace him in the 56th minute. Houchen's diving header from a Gynn cross was then deflected out for a corner, and in the 67th minute, Everton came close to doubling their lead. Heath played a long cross-field pass to Sharp who headed the ball to Power. Despite being kicked in the face by Phillips, Power managed to shoot but his strike was over the Coventry City crossbar. Pickering then struck the Everton crossbar with an overhead kick. With five minutes of the match remaining, Gynn was injured by Heath and had to be substituted for Brian Borrows. In the last moments of the match, Ogrizovic saved a shot from Sharp to maintain Everton's lead and the match ended 1–0 to Everton who won the Charity Shield for the eighth time.

=== Details ===
1 August 1987
15:00

Coventry City	0–1	Everton
		Clarke 44'

Wembley Stadium, London
Attendance: 88,000
Referee: Ray Lewis

Coventry	Everton

1	(England) Steve Ogrizovic
2	(Wales) David Phillips
3	(England) Greg Downs
4	(England) Lloyd McGrath	(substituted off) 56'
5	(England) Brian Kilcline (c)
6	(England) Trevor Peake
7	(England) Dave Bennett
8	(England) Micky Gynn	(substituted off) 86'
9	(Scotland) David Speedie
10	(England) Keith Houchen
11	(England) Nick Pickering
Substitutes:
(England) Jake Findlay
16	(England) Brian Borrows	(substituted on) 86'
(England) Martin Lane
(England) Graham Rodger
12	(England) Steve Sedgeley	Manager:
(England) John Sillett

1	(England) Bobby Mimms
2	(England) Alan Harper
3	(England) Paul Power
4	(Wales) Kevin Ratcliffe (c)
5	(England) Dave Watson	Yellow card
6	(England) Peter Reid
7	(England) Trevor Steven
8	(England) Wayne Clarke
9	(Scotland) Graeme Sharp
10	(England) Adrian Heath
11	(Republic of Ireland) Kevin Sheedy	(substituted off) 46'
Substitutes:
	(England) Alec Chamberlain
15	(England) Neil Pointon	(substituted on) 46'
	(England) Derek Mountfield
	(England) Neil Adams
	(England) Ian Marshall
Manager:
(England) Colin Harvey

== Post-match ==
Speaking of the timing of Everton's goal, Sillett noted "it was a terrible time to give away a goal". However, he indicated that his side's performance "proved we're not a flash in the pan – we're going to be in there with the top teams this season." He reflected on the timing of the match, suggesting that neither side had been sufficiently prepared for the game: "You don't expect an athlete like Sebastian Coe to train for two weeks and then go straight into the Olympic Games, do you? The occasion has come too early for both of us." Despite his side's victory, Harvey bemoaned the various injuries afflicting the club: "We were a few players short and I think it showed particularly in the second half". Harvey also tipped Coventry as possible title winners for the upcoming season. He said "I was recently asked who I thought were the outsiders for our title. I said Coventry City. ... After this performance, I see no reason to change my mind."

The clubs faced one another in the First Division in the 1987–88 season, with both matches ending in 2–1 wins for the away sides, Coventry City winning at Goodison Park in September 1987 and Everton victorious at Highfield Road the following April. Everton ended the league season in fourth place in the First Division, and were it not for the ban on English clubs in European football, would have qualified to play in the 1988–89 UEFA Cup. Coventry City finished in tenth position in the First Division.

== See also ==
- 1986–87 Football League
- 1986–87 FA Cup
