= 1986 FA Charity Shield =

Liverpool	Everton
1	1
- Date: 16 August 1986
- Venue: Wembley Stadium, London
- Referee: Neil Midgley
- Attendance: 88,231

The 1986 FA Charity Shield (also known as the General Motors – FA Charity Shield for sponsorship reasons) was the 64th Charity Shield, a football match contested by the holders of the Football League First Division and FA Cup. This edition featured a Merseyside derby between Liverpool and Everton at Wembley Stadium. Liverpool achieved a First Division and FA Cup double in 1985–86 so they faced Everton who finished as runners-up in the League. The match was played on 16 August 1986.

Adrian Heath opened the scoring for Everton in the 80th minute when he ran in on goal to shoot right footed to the left of the goalkeeper from six yards. Ian Rush equalised in the 88th minute when he side footed to the net from six yards after a low cross from the right. The match finished 1–1. The two clubs shared the title, each holding the shield for six months.

== Match details ==
16 August 1986
15:00

Liverpool	1–1	Everton
Rush 88'	Report	Heath 80'

Wembley Stadium, London
Attendance: 88,231
Referee: Neil Midgley (Salford)

Liverpool	Everton

1	(Zimbabwe) Bruce Grobbelaar	(substituted off) 57'
2	(England) Barry Venison
3	(Republic of Ireland) Jim Beglin
4	(Republic of Ireland) Mark Lawrenson
5	(Republic of Ireland) Ronnie Whelan
6	(Scotland) Alan Hansen (c)
7	(England) Steve McMahon
8	(Australia) Craig Johnston
9	(Wales) Ian Rush
10	(Denmark) Jan Mølby
11	(Scotland) Kevin MacDonald	(substituted off) 65'
Substitutes:
12	(Scotland) Kenny Dalglish	(substituted on) 65'
14	(England) Sammy Lee
15	(Scotland) John Wark
16	(Scotland) Gary Gillespie
17	(England) Mike Hooper	(substituted on) 57'
Manager:
(Scotland) Kenny Dalglish

1	(England) Bobby Mimms
2	(England) Alan Harper
3	(England) Paul Power
4	(Wales) Kevin Ratcliffe (c)
5	(England) Ian Marshall
6	(England) Kevin Langley
7	(England) Trevor Steven
8	(England) Adrian Heath
9	(Scotland) Graeme Sharp
10	(England) Kevin Richardson
11	(Republic of Ireland) Kevin Sheedy	(substituted off) 57'
Substitutes:
12	(England) Paul Wilkinson	(substituted on) 84'
13	(England) Fred Barber
14	(England) Neil Adams	(substituted on) 57' (substituted off) 84'
15	(England) Warren Aspinall
Manager:
(England) Howard Kendall

== See also ==
- 1985–86 Football League
- 1985–86 FA Cup
