= 1982–83 Everton F.C. season =

English football club season

Everton
1982–83 season
- Chairman: Philip Carter
- Manager: Howard Kendall
- Ground: Goodison Park
- First Division: 7th
- FA Cup: Sixth Round
- League Cup: Third Round
- Top goalscorer: League: Graeme Sharp (15); All: Graeme Sharp (17)

During the 1982–83 English football season, Everton F.C. competed in the Football League First Division. They finished 7th in the table with 64 points.

== Final league table ==
Pos	Team	Pld	W	D	L	GF	GA	GD	Pts	Qualification or relegation
5	Nottingham Forest	42	20	9	13	62	50	+12	69	Qualification for the UEFA Cup first round
6	Aston Villa	42	21	5	16	62	50	+12	68	Qualification for the UEFA Cup first round
7	Everton	42	18	10	14	66	48	+18	64	
8	West Ham United	42	20	4	18	68	62	+6	64	
9	Ipswich Town	42	15	13	14	64	50	+14	58	

Source: World Football
Rules for classification: 1) Points; 2) Goal difference; 3) Goals scored

== Results ==
Win	Draw	Loss

=== Football League First Division ===
Date	Opponent	Venue	Result	Attendance	Scorers
28 August 1982	Watford	A	0–2		
31 August 1982	Aston Villa	H	5–0		
4 September 1982	Tottenham Hotspur	H	3–1		
8 September 1982	Manchester United	A	1–2		
11 September 1982	Notts County	A	0–1		
18 September 1982	Norwich City	H	1–1		
25 September 1982	Coventry City	A	2–4		
2 October 1982	Brighton & Hove Albion	H	2–2		
9 October 1982	Manchester City	H	2–1		
16 October 1982	Swansea City	A	3–0		
23 October 1982	Sunderland	H	3–1		
30 October 1982	Southampton	A	2–3		
6 November 1982	Liverpool	H	0–5		
13 November 1982	Arsenal	A	1–1		
20 November 1982	West Browmwich Albion	H	0–0		
27 November 1982	West Ham United	A	0–2		
4 December 1982	Birmingham City	H	0–0		
11 December 1982	Ipswich Town	A	2–0		
18 December 1982	Luton Town	H	5–0		
27 December 1982	Stoke City	A	0–1		
28 December 1982	Nottingham Forest	H	3–1		
1 January 1983	West Bromwich Albion	A	2–2		
3 January 1983	Tottenham Hotspur	A	1–2		
15 January 1983	Watford	H	1–0		
22 January 1983	Norwich City	A	1–0		
5 February 1983	Notts County	H	3–0		
12 February 1983	Aston Villa	A	0–2		
26 February 1983	Swansea City	H	2–2		
2 March 1983	Manchester City	A	0–0		
5 March 1983	Sunderland	A	1–2		
15 March 1983	Southampton	H	2–0		
19 March 1983	Liverpool	A	0–0		
26 March 1983	Arsenal	H	2–3		
2 April 1983	Nottingham Forest	A	0–2		
4 April 1983	Stoke City	H	3–1		
9 April 1983	Brighton & Hove Albion	A	2–1		
19 April 1983	Manchester United	H	2–0		
23 April 1983	Birmingham City	H	0–1		
30 April 1983	West Ham United	H	2–0		
2 May 1983	Coventry City	H	1–0		
7 May 1983	Luton Town	A	5–1		
14 May 1983	Ipswich Town	H	1–1		

=== FA Cup ===
Round	Date	Opponent	Venue	Result	Attendance	Goalscorers
3	8 January 1983	Newport County	A	1–1	Sheedy 89'	
3:R	11 January 1983	Newport County	H	2–1	Sharp 27', King 53'	
4	30 January 1983	Shrewsbury Town	H	2–1	Sheedy 41', Heath 63'	
5	19 February 1983	Tottenham Hotspur	H	2–0	King 48', Sharp 64'	
6	12 March 1983	Manchester United	A	0–1		

=== League Cup ===
Round	Date	Opponent	Venue	Result	Attendance	Goalscorers
2:1	5 October 1982	Newport County	A	2–0		
2:2	27 October 1982	Newport County	H	2–2		
3	9 November 1982	Arsenal	H	1–1		
3:R	23 November 1982	Arsenal	A	0–3		
