= 1988–89 Everton F.C. season =

English football club season

Everton
1988–89 season
- Chairman: Philip Carter
- Manager: Colin Harvey
- Ground: Goodison Park
- First Division: 8th
- FA Cup: Runners-up
- League Cup: Fourth Round
- Full Members' Cup: Runners-up
- Football League Centenary Trophy: Quarter-finals
- Top goalscorer: League: Tony Cottee (13); All: Tony Cottee (18)
- Highest home attendance: 45,994 vs. Liverpool (3 May 1989)
- Lowest home attendance: 3,703 vs. Millwall (20 December 1988)

During the 1988–89 English football season, Everton F.C. competed in the Football League First Division.

Everton finished 8th in the table with 54 points after a disappointing season in the league, where they failed to mount a title challenge.

The Toffees were the runners-up in the FA Cup, losing to Liverpool in a Merseyside final at Wembley Stadium and advanced to the 4th round of the League Cup.

Before the start of the season, Everton became the first English club to pay a £2million fee when signing West Ham striker Tony Cottee.

== Final League Table ==
Pos	Team	Pld	W	D	L	GF	GA	GD	Pts
6	Tottenham Hotspur	38	15	12	11	60	46	+14	57
7	Coventry City	38	14	13	11	47	42	+5	55
8	Everton	38	14	12	12	50	45	+5	54
9	Queens Park Rangers	38	14	11	13	43	37	+6	53
10	Millwall	38	14	11	13	47	52	−5	53

Source: World Football
Rules for classification: 1) Points; 2) Goal difference; 3) Goals scored

== Results ==
=== Legend ===
Win	Draw	Loss

=== Football League First Division ===
Date	Opponent	Venue	Result	Attendance	Scorers
27 August 1988	Newcastle United	H	4–0	41,560	Cottee 3, Sharp
3 September 1988	Coventry City	A	1–0	18,625	Cottee
10 September 1988	Nottingham Forest	H	1–1	34,003	Heath
17 September 1988	Millwall	A	1–2	17,507	McLeary (og)
24 September 1988	Luton Town	H	0–2	26,017	
1 October 1988	Wimbledon	A	1–2	6,367	Heath
8 October 1988	Southampton	H	4–1	25,356	Cottee 2, Watson, Steven
22 October 1988	Aston Villa	A	0–2	26,636	
30 October 1988	Manchester United	H	1–1	27,005	Cottee
5 November 1988	Sheffield Wednesday	A	1–1	21,761	Steven (pen)
12 November 1988	Charlton Athletic	A	2–1	8,627	Sharp, Reid
19 November 1988	Norwich City	H	1–1	28,118	Steven (pen)
26 November 1988	West Ham United	A	1–0	22,176	Steven
3 December 1988	Tottenham Hotspur	H	1–0	29,657	Cottee
11 December 1988	Liverpool	A	1–1	42,372	Clarke (pen)
17 December 1988	Queens Park Rangers	A	0–0	10,067	
26 December 1988	Middlesbrough	H	2–1	32,651	Steven, Cottee
31 December 1988	Coventry City	H	3–1	30,790	Sheedy 2, Bracewell
2 January 1989	Nottingham Forest	A	0–2	26,008	
14 January 1989	Arsenal	H	1–3	34,825	McDonald
21 January 1989	Luton Town	A	0–1	9,013	
4 February 1989	Wimbledon	H	1–1	23,365	Sharp (pen)
11 February 1989	Southampton	A	1–1	15,845	Sheedy
14 February 1989	Aston Villa	H	1–1	20,142	Cottee
25 February 1989	Derby County	A	2–3	17,103	Sharp, Clarke
11 March 1989	Sheffield Wednesday	H	1–0	22,542	Cottee
22 March 1989	Newcastle United	A	0–2	20,933	
25 March 1989	Millwall	H	1–1	27,062	Sheedy (pen)
27 March 1989	Middlesbrough	A	3–3	21,351	Cottee, Sheedy, Nevin
1 April 1989	Queens Park Rangers	H	4–1	23,028	Clarke, Sheedy (pen), Cottee, Steven
8 April 1989	Arsenal	A	0–2	37,608	
10 April 1989	Charlton Athletic	H	3–2	16,316	Sharp, Sheedy, Nevin
22 April 1989	Tottenham Hotspur	A	1–2	28,568	McDonald
3 May 1989	Liverpool	H	0–0	45,994	
6 May 1989	Norwich City	A	0–1	13,239	
10 May 1989	Manchester United	A	2–1	26,722	Sharp 2
13 May 1989	West Ham United	H	3–1	21,694	Sheedy, Watson, Bracewell
15 May 1989	Derby County	H	1–0	17,826	Wilson

=== FA Cup ===
Round	Date	Opponent	Venue	Result	Attendance	Goalscorers
3	7 January 1989	West Bromwich Albion	A	1–1	31,186	Sheedy (pen)
3 Rep	11 January 1989	West Bromwich Albion	H	1–0	31,697	Sheedy
4	28 January 1989	Plymouth Argyle	A	1–1	27,566	Sheedy (pen)
4 Rep	31 January 1989	Plymouth Argyle	H	4–0	28,542	Sharp 2, Nevin, Sheedy
5	18 February 1989	Barnsley	A	1–0	32,551	Sharp
QF	19 March 1989	Wimbledon	H	1–0	24,562	McCall
SF	15 April 1989	Norwich City	Villa Park	1–0	46,553	Nevin
Final	20 May 1989	Liverpool	Wembley	2–3 (aet)	82,800	McCall 2

=== League Cup ===
Round	Date	Opponent	Venue	Result	Attendance	Goalscorers
2:1	27 September 1988	Bury	H	3–0	11,071	Sharp, McDonald (pen), McCall
2:2	11 October 1988	Bury	A	2–2 (agg 5–2)	4,592	Steven (pen), Sharp
3	8 November 1988	Oldham Athletic	H	1–1	17,230	Steven (pen)
3 Rep	29 November 1988	Oldham Athletic	A	2–0	14,573	Cottee 2
4	14 December 1988	Bradford City	A	1–3	15,055	Watson

=== Full Members' Cup/Simod Cup ===
Round	Date	Opponent	Venue	Result	Attendance	Goalscorers
3	20 December 1988	Millwall	H	2–0	3,703	Cottee, Hurlock (og)
QF	18 January 1989	Wimbledon	A	2–1	2,477	Clarke 2
SF	28 February 1989	Queens Park Rangers	H	1–0	7,072	Nevin
Final	30 April 1989	Nottingham Forest	Wembley	3–4 (aet)	46,606	Sharp, Cottee 2

=== Football League Centenary Trophy/Mercantile Credit Centenary Trophy ===
Round	Date	Opponent	Venue	Result	Attendance	Goalscorers
QF	29 August 1988	Manchester United	A	0–1	16,439	
