= Adrian Heath =

English footballer and manager (born 1961)

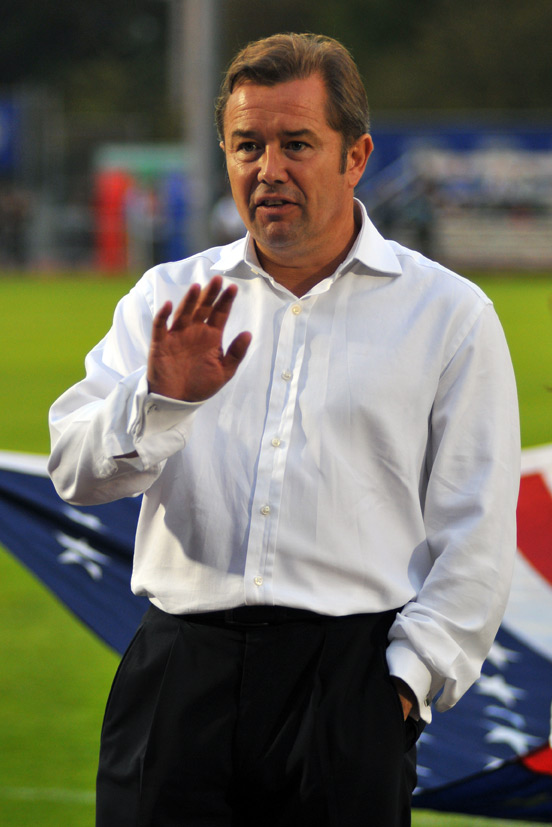

Personal information
- Full name: Adrian Paul Heath
- Date of birth: 11 January 1961 (age 65)
- Place of birth: Newcastle-under-Lyme, England
- Height: 5 ft 6 in (1.68 m)
- Positions: Striker; attacking midfielder

Senior career*
Years	Team	Apps	(Gls)
1979–1982	Stoke City	95	(16)
1982–1988	Everton	226	(71)
1988–1989	Espanyol	24	(1)
1989–1990	Aston Villa	9	(0)
1990–1992	Manchester City	75	(4)
1992	Stoke City	6	(0)
1992–1995	Burnley	115	(28)
1995–1996	Sheffield United	4	(0)
1996–1997	Burnley	5	(0)
Total		559	(120)

International career
1981–1982	England U21	8	(3)

Managerial career
- 1996–1997: Burnley
- 1999: Sheffield United
- 2005: Coventry City (caretaker)
- 2007: Coventry City (caretaker)
- 2008–2010: Austin Aztex
- 2011–2016: Orlando City
- 2017–2023: Minnesota United
- * Club domestic league appearances and goals

Adrian Paul Heath (born 11 January 1961) is an English football manager and former player. He most recently served as head coach of Major League Soccer club Minnesota United until October 2023. As a player, he is best known for his six seasons at Everton, where he won two First Division titles and an FA Cup. As a manager, Heath initially worked in his native England before moving abroad to Orlando City, an expansion side in the American second division. Orlando City had the best start of any newly founded team in the history of American soccer, winning multiple honours before joining MLS in 2015.

== Playing career ==
Born in Newcastle-under-Lyme, Staffordshire, Heath started his playing career at Stoke City having joined the club from playing in the local Lads and dads League. He signed a professional contract at 17 and played in the reserves under the guidance of player coach Howard Kendall, Heath's impressive performances helped the second string to second place in the Central League and saw him win the club's young player of the year award. Known as "Inchy" due to his small stature, he burst on to the first team scene in 1979–80 displaying great maturity in the First Division and scoring two vital goals at the end of the season which ensured Stoke's survival. He scored seven goals in 41 matches in 1980–81 and five in 20 in 1981–82. With Heath fast becoming one of the most sought after midfielders in the country Richie Barker allowed him to join Everton, who were being managed by Kendall, in January 1982 for a then club record fee of £750,000.

He became Everton's top scorer in his second full season, scoring 18 in all competitions in the 1983–84 season. His goal against Third Division Oxford United in the League Cup quarter final is widely credited with changing Everton's fortunes in the 1983–84 season, in which they went on to reach the League Cup final (losing to Liverpool in the replay) and lift the FA Cup, their first silverware since 1970. Grabbing a poor Kevin Brock back-pass, Heath scored a goal away at Oxford to equalize the match and earn Everton a chance to turn things around.

Heath was a key member of the successful Everton side of the mid-1980s, winning two league titles in 1985 and 1987 and the FA Cup in 1984. However his participation in the 1984–85 title-winning season was cut short in December after a challenge from Sheffield Wednesday's Brian Marwood resulted in a cruciate ligament injury which kept him out for the rest of the season. It is thought that Heath was in line for a call-up to Bobby Robson's England squad at the time. The injury prevented Heath from playing in the final of the European Cup Winner's Cup in which Everton beat Rapid Vienna 3–1. In 2018, the Everton Heritage Society arranged for Heath to receive a replica of the Cup Winner's Cup medal which was presented to him at Goodison Park in November 2018 during halftime of a Premier League fixture against Cardiff City.

In the 1988–89 season, Heath had a spell in Spain with Espanyol. After a single season, he returned to England, where he spent the remainder of his career. In 1990, Manchester City manager Howard Kendall signed Heath from Aston Villa. Heath was one of a number of former Everton players signed by Kendall, and the transfer marked the third different club at which Heath had played under Kendall. His debut came as a substitute against Charlton Athletic in January 1990. During the 1990–91 season, Heath forged a strike partnership with Niall Quinn, the short and agile Heath contrasting with Quinn's aerial ability. The pair started 33 matches together, though Heath scored only one goal, in the second match of the season. Heath then had a barren run that lasted 46 matches and came to an end in November 1991, when Heath scored two goals in a League Cup tie at Queen's Park Rangers. As the 1991–92 season progressed, Heath lost his place in the team to young striker Mike Sheron.

In March 1992, Heath briefly returned to his first club Stoke City, until the end of the 1991–92 season. In that brief spell back at the Victoria Ground, Heath played in six league matches a play-off match against Stockport County and also played in the 1992 Football League Trophy Final which saw Stoke beat Stockport 1–0. Heath also had a notable three-year stint at Burnley from 1992 to 1995, where he helped them lift the 1994 Second Division play-Off trophy. Following a brief period at Sheffield United, he returned to Burnley as player-manager before retiring at the end of the 1996–97 season which served him accolades.

== Managerial career ==
=== England ===
Heath began his managerial career as player-manager of Burnley in March 1996. He left after the 1996–97 season having finished ninth in the Second Division. He worked with former Everton teammate Peter Reid at Sunderland, managing Sunderland Reserves to a Pontins League championship in 1999. That summer, he was appointed manager of Sheffield United but he left the club after only five months. He later followed Reid to Leeds United and Coventry City. When Reid left Coventry in January 2005, Heath stepped in as caretaker. He remained at the club under Reid's successor Micky Adams, and again acted as caretaker in January 2007, before leaving the club after Iain Dowie was appointed.

=== United States ===
Heath was appointed manager of USL-1 expansion team Austin Aztex in February 2008 after a meeting with owner Phil Rawlins in a pub in Newcastle Under Lyme. In 2010, the team relocated to Florida to become Orlando City, playing in the USL PRO division. In Orlando, Heath led the team to two regular season titles and the league championship in their first two years. Heath was named USL coach of the year both years.

After their successes in the USL, Orlando City was granted an expansion franchise in MLS for the 2015 season with Heath at the helm. On 21 November 2014, Heath signed a contract extension committing him to Orlando City through to the end of the 2017 MLS season. Heath was sacked by Orlando City on 7 July 2016 following a 4–0 defeat against FC Dallas.

In November 2016, Heath was hired as head coach for Minnesota United prior to their first season in MLS after a tenure in the North American Soccer League. The team struggled in its early games. Through the first four games Minnesota United conceded 18 goals, more than any other MLS team had allowed in the first six games of a season. Heath got his first win as United's manager with a 4–2 home victory over Real Salt Lake. On 6 October 2023, Heath and Minnesota United parted ways after seven seasons at the club.

== Personal life ==
Adrian Heath's son, Harrison, is also a footballer. In January 2026, Heath revealed that he had been kidnapped and held to ransom by criminals in Morocco posing as football powerbrokers.

== Career statistics ==
=== Club career ===
Appearances and goals by club, season and competition
Club	Season	League			FA Cup		League Cup		Other^{[A]}		Total	
Club	Season	Division	Apps	Goals	Apps	Goals	Apps	Goals	Apps	Goals	Apps	Goals
Stoke City	1978–79	Second Division	2	0	0	0	2	0	0	0	4	0
Stoke City	1979–80	First Division	38	5	1	0	4	0	0	0	43	5
Stoke City	1980–81	First Division	38	6	2	1	1	0	0	0	41	7
Stoke City	1981–82	First Division	17	5	1	0	2	0	0	0	20	5
Stoke City	Total		95	16	4	1	9	0	0	0	108	17
Everton	1981–82	First Division	22	6	0	0	0	0	0	0	22	6
Everton	1982–83	First Division	38	10	5	1	4	0	0	0	47	11
Everton	1983–84	First Division	36	12	7	2	11	4	0	0	54	18
Everton	1984–85	First Division	17	11	0	0	4	1	5	1	26	13
Everton	1985–86	First Division	26	10	6	2	3	1	5	2	40	15
Everton	1986–87	First Division	41	11	3	0	4	3	4	2	52	16
Everton	1987–88	First Division	29	9	8	1	7	2	2	0	46	12
Everton	1988–89	First Division	7	2	0	0	2	0	1	0	10	2
Everton	Total		226	71	29	6	35	11	17	5	307	93
Espanyol	1988–89	La Liga	24	1	0	0	0	0	0	0	24	1
Aston Villa	1989–90	First Division	9	0	1	0	2	0	0	0	12	0
Manchester City	1989–90	First Division	12	2	0	0	0	0	0	0	12	2
Manchester City	1990–91	First Division	35	1	2	0	3	0	2	0	42	1
Manchester City	1991–92	First Division	28	1	1	0	5	2	1	0	35	3
Manchester City	Total		75	4	3	0	8	2	3	0	89	6
Stoke City	1991–92	Third Division	6	0	0	0	0	0	4	0	10	0
Burnley	1992–93	Second Division	43	19	5	3	1	0	1	0	50	22
Burnley	1993–94	Second Division	41	9	4	1	3	0	5	0	53	10
Burnley	1994–95	First Division	27	0	3	2	4	0	0	0	34	2
Burnley	1995–96	Second Division	4	0	0	0	1	0	1	0	6	0
Burnley	Total		115	28	12	6	9	0	7	0	143	34
Sheffield United	1995–96	First Division	4	0	1	0	0	0	0	0	5	0
Burnley	1995–96	Second Division	3	0	0	0	0	0	0	0	3	0
Burnley	1996–97	Second Division	2	0	0	0	0	0	0	0	2	0
Burnley	Total		5	0	0	0	0	0	0	0	5	0
Career total			559	120	50	13	63	13	31	5	703	151

A. The "Other" column constitutes appearances and goals in the FA Charity Shield, Football League Trophy, Football League play-offs, Full Members Cup, Mercantile Credit Centenary Trophy, Screen Sport Super Cup, UEFA Cup Winners' Cup.

=== Managerial career ===
As of 5 October 2023

Team	From	To	Record				
Team	From	To	G	W	D	L	Win %
Burnley	7 March 1996	27 June 1997	72	27	17	28	37.50
Sheffield United	15 June 1999	23 November 1999	23	7	5	11	30.43
Coventry City	6 January 2005	23 January 2005	3	1	0	2	33.33
Coventry City	17 January 2007	19 February 2007	5	1	1	3	20.00
Austin Aztex	1 July 2008	24 October 2010	68	24	15	29	35.29
Orlando City (USL Pro)	25 October 2010	31 December 2014	122	82	23	17	67.21
Orlando City (MLS)	1 January 2015	7 July 2016	78	26	21	31	33.33
Minnesota United	29 November 2016	6 October 2023	248	92	56	100	37.10
Total			617	260	150	207	42.14

== Honours ==
=== As a player ===
Everton

- Football League First Division: 1984–85, 1986–87
- FA Cup: 1983–84; runner-up: 1985–86
- FA Charity Shield: 1984, 1985, 1986, 1987
- European Cup Winners' Cup: 1984–85
- Football League Cup runner-up: 1983–84

Stoke City

- Associate Members' Cup: 1991–92

Burnley

- Football League Second Division play-offs: 1994

=== As a manager ===
Individual

- USL Pro Coach of the Year: 2011, 2012
