= 1981–82 Everton F.C. season =

English football club season

Everton
1981–82 season
- Chairman: Philip Carter
- Manager: Howard Kendall
- Ground: Goodison Park
- First Division: 8th
- FA Cup: Third Round
- League Cup: Fourth Round
- Top goalscorer: League: Graeme Sharp (15); All: Graeme Sharp (15)

During the 1981–82 English football season, Everton F.C. competed in the Football League First Division. They finished 8th in the table with 64 points.

== Final league table ==
Pos	Team	Pld	W	D	L	GF	GA	GD	Pts	Qualification or relegation
6	Swansea City	42	21	6	15	58	51	+7	69	Qualification for the Cup Winners' Cup preliminary round (Note: Swansea City qualified for the European Cup Winners' Cup preliminary round as the 1982 Welsh Cup winners.)
7	Southampton	42	19	9	14	72	67	+5	66	Qualification for the UEFA Cup first round
8	Everton	42	17	13	12	56	50	+6	64	
9	West Ham United	42	14	16	12	66	57	+9	58	
10	Manchester City	42	15	13	14	49	50	−1	58	

Source: World Football
Rules for classification: 1) Points; 2) Goal difference; 3) Goals scored

== Results ==
Win	Draw	Loss

=== Football League First Division ===
Date	Opponent	Venue	Result	Attendance	Scorers
29 August 1981	Birmingham City	H	3–1		
2 September 1981	Leeds United	A	1–1		
5 September 1981	Southampton	H	0–1		
12 September 1981	Brighton & Hove Albion	H	1–1		
19 September 1981	Tottenham Hotspur	A	0–3		
22 September 1981	Notts County	H	3–1		
26 September 1981	West Bromwich Albion	H	3–1		
3 October 1981	Stoke City	A	1–3		
10 October 1981	West Ham United	A	1–1		
17 October 1981	Ipswich Town	H	2–1		
24 October 1981	Middlesbrough	A	0–2		
31 October 1981	Manchester City	H	0–1		
7 November 1981	Liverpool	A	1–3		
21 November 1981	Sunderland	H	1–2		
24 November 1981	Notts County	A	2–2		
28 November 1981	Arsenal	A	0–1		
5 December 1981	Swansea City	H	3–1		
19 December 1981	Aston Villa	H	2–0		
28 December 1981	Coventry City	H	3–2		
6 January 1982	Manchester United	A	1–1		
19 January 1982	Southampton	A	1–1		
23 January 1982	Wolverhampton Wanderers	A	3–0		
30 January 1982	Tottenham Hotspur	H	1–1		
6 February 1982	Brighton & Hove Albion	A	1–3		
13 February 1982	Stoke City	H	0–0		
20 February 1982	West Bromwich Albion	A	0–0		
27 February 1982	West Ham United	H	0–0		
6 March 1982	Ipswich Town	A	0–3		
13 March 1982	Middlesbrough	H	2–0		
20 March 1982	Manchester City	A	1–1		
27 March 1982	Liverpool	H	1–3		
3 April 1982	Nottingham Forest	A	1–0		
6 April 1982	Birmingham City	A	2–0		
10 April 1982	Manchester United	H	3–3		
13 April 1982	Coventry City	A	0–1		
17 April 1982	Sunderland	A	1–3		
20 April 1982	Nottingham Forest	H	2–1		
24 April 1982	Arsenal	H	2–1		
1 May 1982	Swansea City	A	3–1		
4 May 1982	Leeds United	H	1–0		
8 May 1982	Wolverhampton Wanderers	H	1–1		
15 May 1982	Aston Villa	A	2–1		

=== FA Cup ===
Round	Date	Opponent	Venue	Result	Attendance	Goalscorers
3	2 January 1982	West Ham United	A	1–2		

=== League Cup ===
Round	Date	Opponent	Venue	Result	Attendance	Goalscorers
2:1	6 October 1981	Coventry City	H	1–1		
2:2	27 October 1981	Coventry City	A	1–0		
3	11 November 1981	Oxford United	H	1–0		
4	15 December 1981	Ipswich Town	H	2–3		

== Squad ==
Steve McMahon Mark Higgins Mike Lyons Trevor Ross Graeme Sharp Neville Southall Kevin Ratcliffe Alan Irvine Billy Wright Gary Stevens Adrian Heath Mike Walsh Jim Arnold Alan Biley Peter Eastoe Kevin Richardson Alan Ainscow Paul Lodge Brian Borrows John Bailey Eamonn O'Keefe Mickey Thomas Mick Ferguson Joe McBride Asa Hartford Howard Kendall Stuart Rimmer
