= Wynberg St Johns =

- Ground: Wynberg, Cape Town

Wynberg St Johns are a South African football club.

Former Welsh international Pat Van Den Hauwe played for the club.

Season	Division	Final position	Games played	Games won	Games Drew	Games lost	Goals for	Goals against	Points	Notes
1996/1997	National First Division (Coastal Stream)	5	30	14	8	8	42	−30	50	
1997/1998	National First Division (Coastal Stream)	3	38	20	9	9	66	−31	69	

== Honours ==
- National First Division (Coastal Stream): 1997/1998 Third Place
