= 1984 FA Cup final =

English association football match

- Event: 1983–84 FA Cup
Everton	Watford
2	0
- Date: 19 May 1984
- Venue: Wembley Stadium, London
- Referee: John Hunting (Leicester)
- Attendance: 100,000

The 1984 FA Cup final was contested by Everton and Watford at Wembley. Everton won 2–0, with one goal by Graeme Sharp and a controversial goal from Andy Gray. He was adjudged by many to have fouled the Watford goalkeeper Steve Sherwood by heading the ball from Sherwood's hands. Everton had reached the final seven times previously, winning in 1906, 1933 and 1966. This was Watford's first FA Cup Final appearance.

With the exception of Andy Gray (who had been a Football League Cup winner earlier in his career with Aston Villa and then Wolverhampton Wanderers), this was the first major honour that any of the Everton players in this match had collected. It also ended Everton's 14-year wait for a trophy and was the first of eight honours they would win over the next four seasons. The period would prove to be the most successful spell in the club's history.

The closest Watford came to scoring was inside the first three minutes when John Barnes miscued a shot on the Everton goal, while Les Taylor's 25-yard shot went wide and Mo Johnston had a narrow miss with a header.

== Match details ==
19 May 1984
15:00 BST

Everton	2–0	Watford
Sharp 38'; Gray 51'	Report

Wembley, London
Attendance: 100,000
Referee: John Hunting

Everton	Watford

GK	1	(Wales) Neville Southall
RB	2	(England) Gary Stevens
LB	3	(England) John Bailey
DF	4	(Wales) Kevin Ratcliffe (c)
DF	5	(England) Derek Mountfield
MF	6	(England) Peter Reid
MF	7	(England) Trevor Steven
FW	8	(England) Adrian Heath
FW	9	(Scotland) Graeme Sharp
FW	10	(Scotland) Andy Gray
MF	11	(England) Kevin Richardson
Substitute:
DF	12	(England) Alan Harper
Manager:
(England) Howard Kendall

GK	1	(England) Steve Sherwood
RB	2	(England) David Bardsley
LB	3	(England) Neil Price		(substituted off) 58'
MF	4	(England) Les Taylor (c)
DF	5	(England) Steve Terry
DF	6	(England) Lee Sinnott
RM	7	(England) Nigel Callaghan
FW	8	(Scotland) Mo Johnston
FW	9	(Scotland) George Reilly
MF	10	(Wales) Kenny Jackett
LM	11	(England) John Barnes
Substitute:
FW	12	(England) Paul Atkinson	(substituted on) 58'
Manager:
(England) Graham Taylor

Match rules

- 90 minutes
- 30 minutes of extra-time if necessary
- Replay if scores still level
- One named substitute
- Maximum of one substitution
