= Paul Atkinson (footballer, born 1961) =

English footballer

Personal information
- Full name: Paul Graham Atkinson
- Date of birth: 14 August 1961 (age 65)
- Place of birth: Otley, England
- Height: 5 ft 10 in (1.78 m)
- Position: Winger

Youth career
- 1977–1979: Oldham Athletic

Senior career*
Years	Team	Apps	(Gls)
1979–1983	Oldham Athletic	143	(11)
1983–1984	Watford	11	(0)
1984–1988	Oldham Athletic	33	(1)
1986–1987	→ Swansea City (loan)	6	(1)
1987	→ Bolton Wanderers (loan)	3	(0)
1987	→ Swansea City (loan)	12	(2)
1988–1990	Burnley	22	(1)
	Northwich Victoria	?	(?)
Total		230	(16)
- * Club domestic league appearances and goals

Paul Graham Atkinson (born 14 August 1961) is an English retired professional footballer who played as a winger. He appeared in the 1984 FA Cup Final with Watford.

== Career ==
As a youth, Atkinson represented both the Leeds Schoolboys and Yorkshire Schoolboys teams before joining Oldham Athletic as an apprentice in 1977. He was given his first professional contract two years later and made his senior debut on 18 August 1979, scoring in the 2–3 defeat away at Newcastle United. He became a first-team regular for Oldham over the following four seasons and scored a total of 11 goals in 143 league matches for the club. In July 1983, Atkinson was signed by Watford manager Graham Taylor for a transfer fee of £175,000. A broken ankle sustained in pre-season delayed his debut in the First Division. When he returned to action later in the season, he failed to hold down a regular place in the team and played only 11 league games. Atkinson's last appearance for Watford came on 19 May 1984, coming on as a second-half substitute for Neil Price in the 0–2 defeat to Everton in the 1984 FA Cup Final. He spent one more season with the club but did not make a first-team appearance and left in August 1985, returning to Oldham for a fee of £30,000.

Atkinson was not a regular starter during his second spell at Oldham, playing 33 league matches over the following three seasons. He was loaned out three times during the 1986–87 campaign; he joined Fourth Division side Swansea City in December 1986, scoring once in six appearances. He later had a one-month loan spell at Bolton Wanderers before returning to Swansea City in March 1987 for the remainder of the season. Atkinson was released by Oldham in the summer of 1988 and subsequently signed for Burnley. On his second league appearance for the Lancashire side, he scored a goal in the 6–0 Fourth Division win against York City. He spent two seasons with Burnley, playing 35 games in all competitions, four of them as a substitute, before leaving the club at the end of the 1989–90 season. Atkinson then moved into non-League football and had a spell with Northwich Victoria.

== Honours ==
Watford

- FA Cup runner-up: 1983–84
