= Colin Griffin (footballer) =

English footballer (born 1956)

Personal information
- Full name: Colin Raymond Griffin
- Date of birth: 8 January 1956 (age 70)
- Place of birth: Dudley, England
- Height: 6 ft 0 in (1.83 m)
- Position: Central defender

Youth career
- –1976: Derby County

Senior career*
Years	Team	Apps	(Gls)
1976–1988	Shrewsbury Town	406	(7)
- * Club domestic league appearances and goals

Colin Raymond Griffin (born 8 January 1956) is an English retired professional footballer who made over 400 appearances as a central defender in the Football League for Shrewsbury Town. He made over 500 appearances in all competitions for the club. Griffin later coached at Gay Meadow and was inducted into the club's Hall of Fame in 2012.

== Personal life ==
After quitting football, Griffin worked as a postman.

== Honours ==
Shrewsbury Town

- Football League Third Division: 1978–79

Individual

- Shrewsbury Town Hall of Fame
