= Ian Snodin =

English footballer (born 1963)

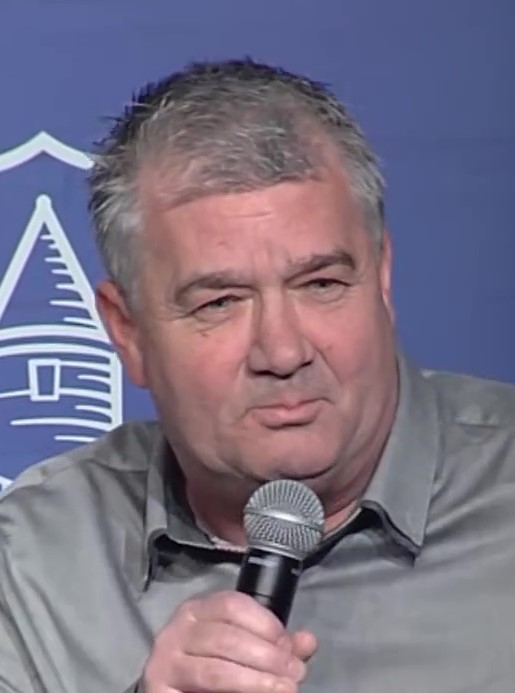
- Snodin in 2018

Personal information
- Full name: Ian Snodin
- Date of birth: 15 August 1963 (age 63)
- Place of birth: Thrybergh, Rotherham, England
- Height: 5 ft 7 in (1.70 m)
- Position: Midfielder

Youth career
- Doncaster Rovers

Senior career*
Years	Team	Apps	(Gls)
1980–1985	Doncaster Rovers	188	(25)
1985–1987	Leeds United	51	(6)
1987–1995	Everton	148	(3)
1994	→ Sunderland (loan)	6	(0)
1995–1997	Oldham Athletic	57	(0)
1997–1998	Scarborough	36	(0)
1998–2000	Doncaster Rovers	2	(0)
Total		488	(34)

International career
1984–1985	England U21	4	(0)

Managerial career
- 1998–2000: Doncaster Rovers
- * Club domestic league appearances and goals

Ian Snodin (born 15 August 1963) is an English football manager, former professional player and sports analyst.

As a player he was a midfielder, notably playing for Leeds United and Everton, appearing in the Premier League for the latter. He also played in the Football League with Doncaster Rovers, Sunderland, Oldham Athletic and Scarborough. He was capped four times by the England U21 during the 1984–85 season.

In 1998 he returned to Doncaster as player-manager but following his departure 18 months later has since worked in sports media as a TV and radio analyst.

== Playing career ==
Snodin started his career as a trainee at Doncaster Rovers along with his brother Glynn under manager Billy Bremner, playing in midfield for the club. In September 1982, he scored a hat-trick in a 7–5 victory over Reading at Belle Vue, claiming the match ball ahead of Kerry Dixon who had scored four for the visitors. It would prove to be the only hat-trick of Snodin's career. Even though Doncaster were in the third division at the time, Snodin earned several call-ups to both the England Under-21s and the under-23s due to being such a strong player at such a young age. He soon caught the interest of the Leeds United manager Eddie Gray and was transferred to the club in the summer of 1985 for £200,000. Bremner soon followed Snodin to Leeds and appointed him as captain, replacing Peter Lorimer who had retired from the game. Snodin added class and bite to United's midfield and became the key player in the side.

Division One clubs approached Leeds for his services. Everton and Liverpool both offered £840,000 in 1987, and cash-strapped Leeds accepted. Snodin chose Everton as his next team despite having agreed terms with Liverpool, and moved to Goodison Park in January 1987. Snodin helped his new club to win the title in his debut season. His tenacious attitude was well received by the Everton fans, but it wasn't until Snodin played as an emergency right-back that he flourished for the club. In February 1989 he was called up into the full England squad for a friendly international against Greece. However, Snodin was forced to withdraw due to injury and his problems worsened a few weeks later when he was carried off during a game against Sheffield Wednesday with a serious hamstring problem. Despite lengthy periods of rest and several operations, Snodin struggled to regain his fitness and spent the whole of the 1991–92 season on the sidelines.

In October 1994 he spent a while on loan with Sunderland and then in January 1995 he moved to Oldham Athletic, ending an association of nearly eight years and almost 200 first team appearances. He later played at Scarborough.

== Managerial career ==
Snodin returned to Doncaster Rovers in 1998 as manager, remaining at the club for 18 months whilst they were part of the Football Conference.

== Media career ==
Snodin was a regular analyst on Sky Sports' coverage of the Football Conference, before taking on a similar role at Setanta Sports following a change in the broadcasting rights. He also co-hosts Terrace Talk, a football magazine show, with Liverpool legend Ian St. John every Saturday at midday on Liverpool music station Radio City 96.7 and City Talk 105.9 and occasionally commentates on Everton for the same radio network. He has written a weekly column for the Liverpool Echo.

== Personal life ==
He is the younger brother of fellow professional footballer Glynn Snodin. Ian is married to Joanne and has five children.
