= John Bailey (footballer, born 1957) =

English footballer

Personal information
- Full name: John Anthony Bailey
- Date of birth: 1 April 1957 (age 69)
- Place of birth: Liverpool, England
- Height: 5 ft 8 in (1.73 m)
- Position: Left-back

Youth career
- Blackburn Rovers

Senior career*
Years	Team	Apps	(Gls)
1975–1979	Blackburn Rovers	120	(1)
1979–1985	Everton	171	(3)
1985–1988	Newcastle United	40	(0)
1988–1991	Bristol City	80	(1)
Total		411	(5)

International career
1980	England B	1	(0)
- * Club domestic league appearances and goals

John Anthony Bailey (born 1 April 1957) is an English former professional footballer who was a member of Everton's 1984 FA Cup Final-winning team. He made more than 400 appearances in the Football League for Blackburn Rovers, Everton, Newcastle United and Bristol City as a left back, and represented England at 'B' international level.

== Honours ==
Everton

- FA Cup: 1983–84
- Football League Cup runner-up: 1983–84
