= Ian Marshall (English footballer) =

English footballer (born 1966)

Personal information
- Date of birth: 20 March 1966 (age 60)
- Place of birth: Liverpool, Lancashire, England
- Height: 6 ft 1 in (1.85 m)
- Positions: Defender; striker

Senior career*
Years	Team	Apps	(Gls)
1984–1988	Everton	15	(1)
1988–1993	Oldham Athletic	170	(36)
1993–1996	Ipswich Town	84	(32)
1996–2000	Leicester City	83	(18)
2000–2002	Bolton Wanderers	38	(6)
2001–2002	→ Blackpool (loan)	21	(1)
Total		411	(94)
- * Club domestic league appearances and goals

Ian Marshall (born 20 March 1966) is an English football coach and former professional footballer who played as a striker and defender from 1984 until 2002.

He notably played in the top flight of English football with Everton, Oldham Athletic, Ipswich Town, Leicester City and Bolton Wanderers, as well as playing in the Football League for Blackpool.

== Playing career ==
Marshall made his name playing as a defender and striker for Oldham Athletic but started his career as an apprentice with hometown club Everton. After four years he signed for Oldham for £200,000 and scored nearly 50 goals in almost 200 appearances before joining Ipswich Town in 1993 for £750,000.

At Portman Road he scored 38 times in just over 90 appearances, including five times in his first five games, a feat that has not been repeated since in the Premier League, before being sold to Leicester City for £800,000 in 1996. He played for the Foxes for four seasons, notching up 26 goals in 61 games. He memorably scored away against Atlético Madrid in the 1997–98 UEFA Cup. In April 1999 he also scored a memorable last minute winner against boyhood club Liverpool at Anfield. He was part of Leicester's 2000 League Cup winning team coming on as a substitute in the final, having been cup-tied for their victory in the 1997 Football League Cup Final.

In 2000, Marshall left on a free transfer to join Bolton Wanderers. After helping the Wanderers to the Premier League he went on loan to Blackpool before making the move to Bloomfield Road permanent in January 2002. He scored once for Blackpool, in a 2–1 defeat to Huddersfield Town in February 2002. He captained the side for their victory in the final of the Football League Trophy at the Millennium Stadium on 12 March 2002. "I was carrying an injury and wasn't 100% fit, but I had decided to call it a day and I wanted to finish on a high, which I did. It was a great day, and night come to think of it, and it will be one I will never forget."

== Coaching career ==
He retired from professional football in May 2002. He moved to Canada in 2005, where, in 2012, he was running the Ian Marshall Soccer Academy. In 2016, Marshall was back in Leicester, working as a host at the King Power Stadium.

== Honours ==
Everton

- FA Charity Shield: 1984, 1986 (shared), 1987

Oldham Athletic

- Football League Second Division: 1990–91

Leicester City

- Football League Cup: 1999–2000; runner-up: 1998–99

Bolton Wanderers

- Football League First Division play-offs: 2001

Blackpool

- Football League Trophy: 2001–02
