= Paul Wilkinson (footballer) =

English footballer & coach (born 1964)

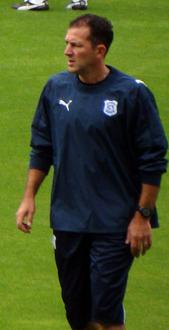
- Wilkinson in 2010

Personal information
- Full name: Paul Wilkinson
- Date of birth: 30 October 1964 (age 62)
- Place of birth: Louth, England
- Height: 6 ft 0 in (1.83 m)
- Position: Striker

Senior career*
Years	Team	Apps	(Gls)
1982–1985	Grimsby Town	87	(33)
1985–1987	Everton	31	(6)
1987–1988	Nottingham Forest	43	(8)
1988–1991	Watford	155	(56)
1991–1996	Middlesbrough	202	(65)
1995	→ Oldham Athletic (loan)	5	(2)
1995	→ Watford (loan)	4	(0)
1996	→ Luton Town (loan)	3	(0)
1996–1997	Barnsley	55	(11)
1997–1998	Millwall	35	(3)
1998–2000	Northampton Town	19	(1)
Total		650	(196)

International career
1985–1986	England U21	4	(1)

Managerial career
- 2017: Northampton Town (caretaker)
- 2018: Grimsby Town (caretaker)
- 2019: Truro City
- 2019: Bury
- * Club domestic league appearances and goals

Paul Wilkinson (born 30 October 1964) is an English football coach and former professional footballer.

He was a striker who had an 18-year professional playing career that saw make over 650 senior appearances and score more than 150 goals. He notably played top flight football for Everton, Nottingham Forest and Middlesbrough. He also played for Grimsby Town, Watford, Oldham Athletic, Luton Town, Barnsley, Millwall and Northampton Town. He was capped 4 times at England U21 level.

Since retiring as a player in 2000 he has held a number of youth development and assistant coaching positions with Leeds United, Grimsby Town, Cardiff City, Sheffield Wednesday, Norwich City and Northampton Town. He returned to Grimsby in 2017 as assistant manager and had a spell as interim manager, before briefly managing of Truro City. He was appointed as the new manager of Bury in August 2019 shortly before the club was expelled from the English Football League.

== Playing career ==
Wilkinson started his career with Grimsby Town before moving to Everton in March 1985. He attracted the attention of Everton when scoring a last minute winner for Grimsby against Everton in a League Cup tie in November 1984. Wilkinson's first goal for Everton was the winning goal in a Merseyside derby in May 1985; Everton had already secured the title by this point.

At this time he won caps for the England under-21 team. During the 1986–87 season he made 32 appearances and scored 12 goals across all competitions, as Everton won the Football League First Division championship. He also scored a hat-trick in a 5–1 League Cup second round second leg victory over Newport County in October 1986. Wilkinson left Everton in March 1987 shortly before they secured the First Division title but he had already made enough league appearances (22) for a medal.

After his spell at Nottingham Forest from March 1987 to June 1988 he went on to play over 150 league games for Watford between 1988 and 1991.

Wilkinson played more than 200 times for Middlesbrough between 1991 and 1996, his most successful season being his first season, in which he scored 24 goals. In the final minutes of the last league game of the season at Wolverhampton Wanderers, he scored a last minute winner to secure Middlesbrough's automatic promotion to the new FA Premier League. He was also the scorer of the club's first Premier League goal, with a 63rd minute consolation strike in a 2–1 defeat at Coventry City on the opening day of the season.

Middlesbrough spent just one season in the top tier, and by the time they won promotion again two years later, Wilkinson was no longer a regular player.

In 1997, partnering former Middlesbrough teammate John Hendrie in attack, Wilkinson helped Barnsley reach the Premier League, scoring one of the goals in the game against Bradford City at Oakwell that sealed their automatic promotion. He played four Premier League games at the start of the following season before joining Millwall in September 1997, scoring on his debut against former club Grimsby Town. He then finished his career at Northampton Town.

== Coaching career ==
After retiring from playing he moved into coaching by taking over as the youth team manager at Leeds United before moving on to become reserve team manager at Grimsby Town and then Cardiff City in October 2003, where he was brought in by manager Lennie Lawrence. In 2012 he moved onto Sheffield Wednesday. He took a position as a coach at the Norwich City academy in October 2014. In 2016 he was appointed assistant manager at Northampton Town under Robert Page.

In April 2017 Wilkinson was appointed assistant manager at Grimsby alongside incoming manager Russell Slade. After Slade was sacked in February 2018, Wilkinson was appointed caretaker manager. Wilkinson lost all three of his games in charge of Grimsby and reverted to his role as assistant manager following the appointment of Michael Jolley as Slade's replacement. On 11 May 2018, it was confirmed that Wilkinson had left Grimsby Town.

On 27 March 2019, he was appointed as the caretaker manager of National League South side Truro City until the end of the season. Truro were relegated from the National League South, but Wilkinson stayed on, signing a full-time two-year contract at the White Tigers on 17 June 2019.

On 2 July 2019, he was appointed as the permanent manager of EFL League One side Bury. Bury's first six matches of the 2019–20 campaign were suspended after the English Football League concluded that the club had not provided sufficient proof of the necessary finances. On 27 August 2019, Bury were expelled from the Football League after a takeover bid for the club collapsed; Wilkinson, therefore, did not get to manage the club in a competitive fixture and was only able to lead the team in pre-season friendlies.

== Honours ==
Middlesbrough

- Football League First Division: 1994–95
