= Bobby Mimms =

British footballer (born 1963)

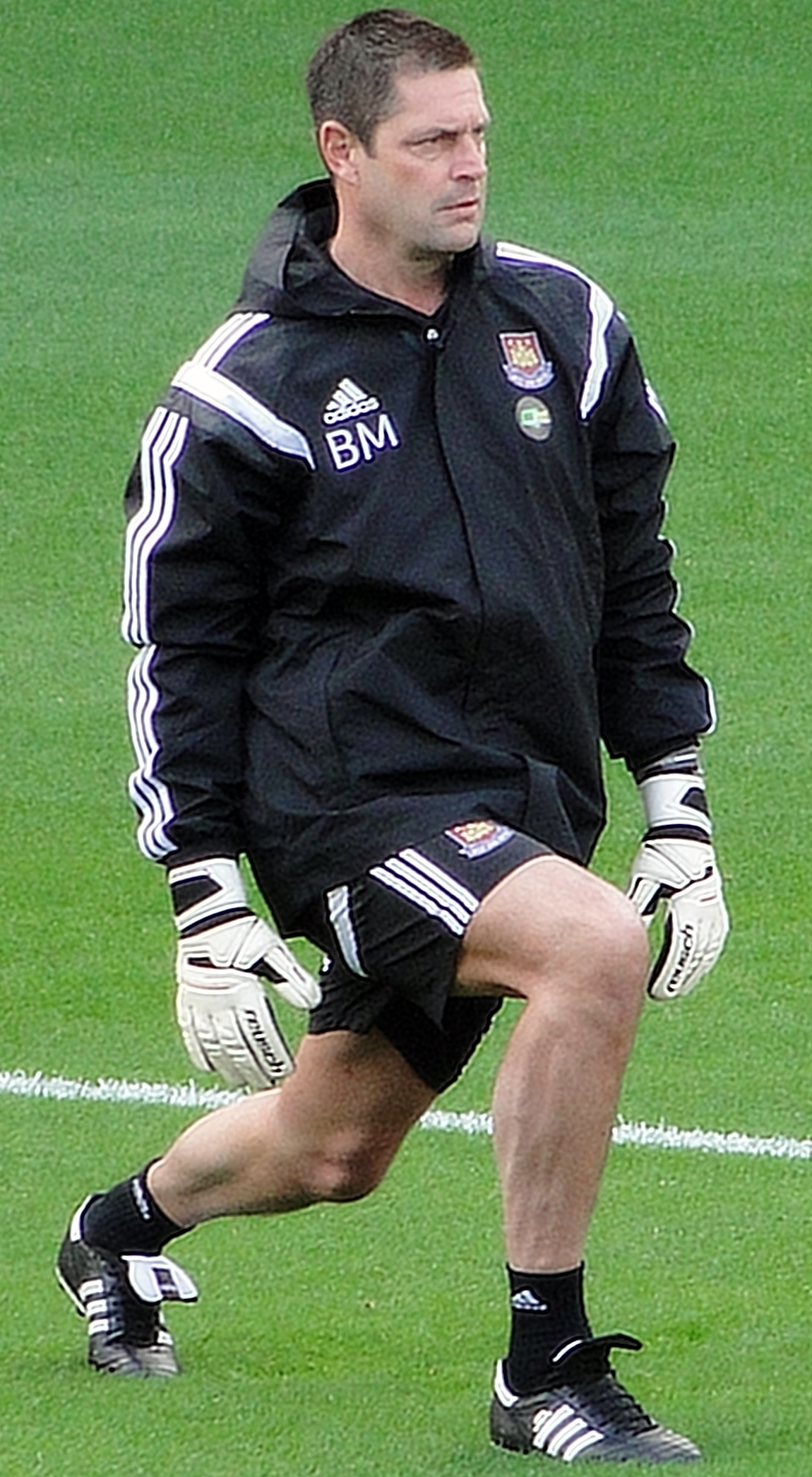
- Mimms as goalkeeping coach for West Ham United in 2014

Personal information
- Full name: Robert Andrew Mimms
- Date of birth: 12 October 1963 (age 63)
- Place of birth: York, England
- Height: 6 ft 3 in (1.91 m)
- Position: Goalkeeper

Senior career*
Years	Team	Apps	(Gls)
1981	Halifax Town	0	(0)
1981–1985	Rotherham United	83	(0)
1985–1988	Everton	29	(0)
1986	→ Notts County (loan)	2	(0)
1986–1987	→ Sunderland (loan)	4	(0)
1987	→ Blackburn Rovers (loan)	6	(0)
1987	→ Manchester City (loan)	3	(0)
1988–1990	Tottenham Hotspur	37	(0)
1990	→ Aberdeen (loan)	6	(0)
1990–1996	Blackburn Rovers	128	(0)
1996	Crystal Palace	1	(0)
1996–1997	Preston North End	27	(0)
1997–1998	Rotherham United	43	(0)
1998	→ York City (loan)	10	(0)
1998–2000	York City	53	(0)
2000–2001	Mansfield Town	45	(0)
Total		477	(0)

International career
1985–1986	England U21	3	(0)
- * Club domestic league appearances and goals

Robert Andrew Mimms (born 12 October 1963) is an English football coach and former player who played as a goalkeeper.

Mimms' career lasted twenty years, and he is best known for his tenure with Blackburn Rovers, where he was a member of the Premier League winning squad in 1995. He also played top flight football for Everton, Tottenham Hotspur and Manchester City as well as a spell in the Scottish Premier League with Aberdeen. Mimms also turned out in the Football League for Halifax Town, Rotherham United, Notts County, Sunderland, Crystal Palace, Preston North End, York City and Mansfield Town. He was capped three times at England U21 level.

Since retiring from playing, Mimms has worked as a goalkeeping coach for Wolverhampton Wanderers, Blackburn Rovers, Oldham Athletic, Bahrain, West Ham United, Blackpool, Bolton Wanderers, Hull City, Jamshedpur, ATK, Bangladesh and SC East Bengal.

== Playing career ==
Born in York, Mimms began his football career as an apprentice at Halifax Town. However, he failed to break into the first team and joined Rotherham United in November 1981 for a fee of £15,000. In 1985, he was sold to Everton, who had just won the league title and European Cup Winners' Cup. During the 1980s, Mimms played for no less than eight different clubs, as he went out on loan from Everton more than once. However, due to an injury to Neville Southall, Mimms played in goal for Everton in the final weeks of the 1985–86 season. Everton were top of the league for most of the last three months of the season, but were pipped to the title on the last day by local rivals Liverpool. Liverpool won the FA Cup as well that season, beating Everton 3–1 in the final, with Mimms in goal for the losers. He played as Everton shared the 1986 FA Charity Shield with Liverpool and won the 1987 FA Charity Shield against Coventry City. He was later sold to Tottenham Hotspur in 1988, following the retirement of Ray Clemence, and had more first team chances at White Hart Lane than he had been given at Goodison Park.

In December 1990, Blackburn Rovers manager Don Mackay signed him for a fee of £250,000 from Tottenham Hotspur making him Blackburn's most expensive transfer at the time. He was signed in the early stages of Jack Walker's backing of Blackburn, and just weeks before Walker took full control of the Second Division club. Blackburn had a slow start to the 1991–92 season, and Mackay was sacked in early September, being replaced the following month by Kenny Dalglish. Dalglish made several substantial signings during the season and Blackburn reached the playoff final where they beat Leicester City 1–0, ending 26 years outside the top flight. Mimms was one of the players who kept his place in the team throughout the season. Mimms was an integral part of this team. However, Jack Walker was not one to rest on his laurels and after the club's promotion vast amounts of money were spent to recruit the finest talents in the country to Ewood Park. Players such as Alan Shearer, Stuart Ripley, Graeme Le Saux and Kevin Gallacher were brought to the club and Mimms was a key part of the team which finished fourth in the 1992–93 season, just missing out on a UEFA Cup place. In November 1993, Southampton goalkeeper Tim Flowers was brought in as the new number one. From then on, Mimms was rarely selected in the starting line-up, his four appearances in the 1994–95 season not being enough for a title medal, and in early 1996 joined Crystal Palace, where he played just once. He then dropped into the lower divisions, playing for Preston North End, Rotherham United, hometown club York City and finished off his playing career at Mansfield Town in 2001.

== Coaching career ==
Between 2001 and 2008, Mimms worked as goalkeeping coach at Wolverhampton Wanderers, before returning to Blackburn to fulfil the same role in August 2008, until he was sacked on 27 December 2012. During the pre-season preceding the 2013–14 season, Mimms was appointed goalkeeping coach at Oldham Athletic. In February 2014, he left his role at Oldham to join the Bahrain as their new goalkeeping coach. In October 2014, Mimms was appointed as goalkeeping coach at Premier League side West Ham United.

After leaving West Ham, he had short spells coaching at Blackpool and Bolton Wanderers, and in November 2016, joined the coaching staff at Hull City following goalkeeper coach Gary Walsh's move to Aston Villa. He left the club in January 2017, following the sacking of head coach Mike Phelan.

After leaving Hull City, he joined Jamshedpur in the Indian Super League as a goalkeeper coach under Steve Coppell in September 2017. In June 2018, he joined ATK with Coppell as a goalkeeper coach. After the sacking of Coppell, he also left the club after the Super Cup in April 2019. In June 2019, he was appointed as the goalkeeper coach of Bangladesh. He became goalkeeping coach of SC East Bengal, but left his role in September 2021.

In October 2022 Mimms signed a twelve-month contract with the Fiji Football Association to be the Fiji national goalkeeper coach and to work closely with the other goalkeeping coaches in Fiji. In May 2023 Mimms was head coach of the Fiji national under-20 football team at the 2023 FIFA U-20 World Cup.

== Honours ==
Everton

- FA Charity Shield: 1986 (shared), 1987
- FA Cup runner-up: 1985–86

Blackburn Rovers

- Football League Second Division play-offs: 1992
