= Neil Pointon =

English footballer

Personal information
- Full name: Neil Geoffrey Pointon
- Date of birth: 28 November 1964 (age 61)
- Place of birth: Church Warsop, Nottinghamshire, England
- Height: 5 ft 10 in (1.78 m)
- Position: Full-back

Senior career*
Years	Team	Apps	(Gls)
1981–1985	Scunthorpe United	159	(2)
1985–1990	Everton	102	(5)
1990–1992	Manchester City	74	(2)
1992–1995	Oldham Athletic	95	(3)
1995–1998	Heart of Midlothian	67	(3)
1998–2000	Walsall	61	(0)
2000	Chesterfield	10	(0)
2000–2001	Hednesford Town	21	(0)
2002–2003	Mossley	15	(1)
Total		604	(16)
- * Club domestic league appearances and goals

Neil Geoffrey Pointon (born 28 November 1964) is an English former professional footballer. Pointon was a left-back who is perhaps best remembered for playing for Everton, Manchester City and Oldham Athletic.

== Career ==
Pointon joined Scottish Premier Division outfit Heart of Midlothian in 1995, enjoying a number of seasons up in Scotland before later playing for Walsall, Chesterfield and Hednesford Town. He scored for Hednesford against former club Oldham Athletic in an FA Cup tie at Keys Park.

On 30 May 2025, he retired as a coach at the Bolton Wanderers academy after fifteen years service with the club.
