= Pat Van Den Hauwe =

Welsh footballer

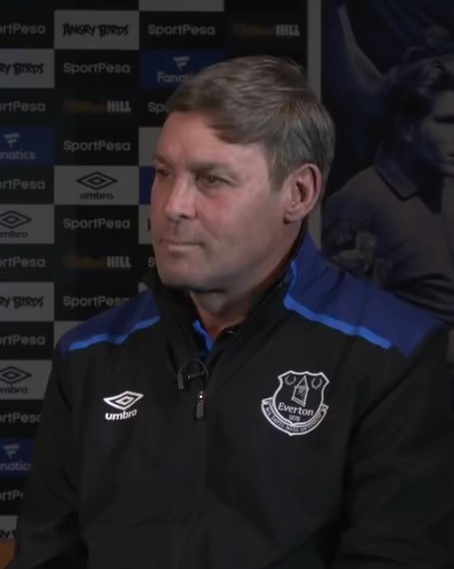
- Van Den Hauwe in 2018

Personal information
- Full name: Patrick William Roger Van Den Hauwe
- Date of birth: 16 December 1960 (age 65)
- Place of birth: Dendermonde, Belgium
- Height: 6 ft 0 in (1.83 m)
- Position: Defender

Youth career
- 1977–1978: Birmingham City

Senior career*
Years	Team	Apps	(Gls)
1978–1984	Birmingham City	123	(1)
1984–1989	Everton	135	(2)
1989–1993	Tottenham Hotspur	116	(0)
1993–1995	Millwall	27	(0)
1996	Hellenic		
1997	Wynberg St Johns		
Total		401	(3)

International career
1985–1989	Wales	13	(0)

Managerial career
- 2007: F.C. Cape Town (assistant)
- * Club domestic league appearances and goals

Patrick William Roger Van Den Hauwe (born 16 December 1960) is a former professional footballer who made 401 appearances in the Football League playing for Birmingham City, Everton, Tottenham Hotspur and Millwall. Born in Belgium and raised in England, he chose to play international football for Wales, making 13 appearances.

== Club career ==
Born in Belgium with an English mother, Van Den Hauwe was brought up in London, and joined Birmingham City as an apprentice in July 1977. He made his debut in the First Division as a 17-year-old, on 7 October 1978 in a 2–1 home defeat to Manchester City. He played 143 games for Birmingham in all competitions before joining Everton in September 1984 for a fee of £100,000. He helped them win the league title and European Cup Winners' Cup that season, as well as a second league title two years later – when his goal against Norwich City at Carrow Road confirmed them as champions.

In 1989, he signed for Tottenham Hotspur for a fee of £575,000, making his debut in a 2–0 defeat to Aston Villa on 9 September 1989. He won the FA Cup with Tottenham in 1991. In total he made 110 league appearances (six of them as substitute) between 1989 and 1993, but never scored. He finished his Football League career with Millwall.

He was commonly referred to as "Psycho Pat" by supporters, and used the nickname as the title of his autobiography.

== International career ==
As a player with British citizenship born outside the UK, eligibility rules of the time meant that Van Den Hauwe qualified to play for the national football team of any of the four Home Nations—England, Scotland, Wales or Northern Ireland. Van Den Hauwe spurned offers from England under Bobby Robson and Belgium under Guy Thys to represent Wales, having been recommended to Mike England by Everton team-mates Kevin Ratcliffe and Neville Southall. It was often speculated in the press that Van Den Hauwe had made this decision because he had Welsh ancestry, but according to his autobiography this was not the case. "No parent or grandparent—or even great grandparents—of mine were Welsh", he wrote.

Van Den Hauwe made his international début for Wales in a 1986 FIFA World Cup qualification – UEFA Group 7 game versus Spain which ended with a 3–0 victory at the Racecourse Ground on 30 April 1985. His last game for Wales came on 26 April 1989 in a friendly 2–0 loss against Sweden, also at the Racecourse Ground.

== Personal life ==
On 19 June 1993 he married model Mandy Smith, the former wife of Rolling Stones' bassist Bill Wyman, but they separated two years later and divorced in 1997.

== Playing statistics ==
Season	Played	Scored	League
Birmingham City
1978–1979	8	0	Division 1
1979–1980	1	0	Division 2
1980–1981	4	0	Division 1
1981–1982	31	0	Division 1
1982–1983	31	1	Division 1
1983–1984	42	0	Division 1
1984–1985	6	0	Division 2
Everton
1984–1985	31	0	Division 1
1985–1986	40	1	Division 1
1986–1987	11	1	Division 1
1987–1988	28	0	Division 1
1988–1989	25	0	Division 1
Tottenham Hotspur
1989–1990	31	0	Division 1
1990–1991	32	0	Division 1
1991–1992	35	0	Division 1
1992–1993	18	0	Premier League
1993–1994	0	0	Premier League
Hellenic FC
1995–1996	?	?	NSL Premiership
Wynberg St Johns
1996–1997	?	?	?

== Honours ==
Birmingham City

- Football League Second Division promotion: 1979–80

Everton

- Football League First Division: 1984–85, 1986–87
- FA Charity Shield: 1985
- UEFA Cup Winners' Cup: 1984–85
- FA Cup runner-up: 1984–85, 1985–86, 1988–89
- Full Members' Cup runner-up: 1988–89

Tottenham Hotspur

- FA Cup: 1990–91
- FA Charity Shield: 1991 (shared)

== See also ==
- List of Wales international footballers born outside Wales
