= Derek Mountfield =

English footballer (born 1962)

Personal information
- Date of birth: 2 November 1962 (age 63)
- Place of birth: Tuebrook, Liverpool, England
- Height: 6 ft 1 in (1.85 m)
- Position: Centre-back

Senior career*
| Years | Team | Apps | (Gls) |
| 1980–1982 | Tranmere Rovers | 26 | (1) |
| 1982–1988 | Everton | 106 | (19) |
| 1988–1991 | Aston Villa | 90 | (9) |
| 1991–1994 | Wolverhampton Wanderers | 83 | (4) |
| 1994–1995 | Carlisle United | 31 | (3) |
| 1995 | Northampton Town | 4 | (0) |
| 1995–1998 | Walsall | 99 | (2) |
| 1999 | Scarborough | 6 | (0) |
| Total | | 445 | (38) |

International career
| 1984 | England U21 | 1 | (0) |
| 1984 | England B | 1 | (0) |

Managerial career
- 1999: Scarborough
- 2000–2001: Cork City
- * Club domestic league appearances and goals

Derek Mountfield (born 2 November 1962) is an English former footballer who played as a centre-back.

His time at top-flight clubs Everton and subsequently Aston Villa were where he gained most fame, as Everton enjoyed successful periods at this time. Aston Villa pushed for honours during the early 1990s.

== Playing career ==
=== Club ===
After turning professional, Wirral-born Mountfield spent a season-and-a-half at local club Tranmere Rovers before moving across the River Mersey to play for Everton. He signed for £30,000 prior to the 1982–83 season. He formed a defensive partnership with Kevin Ratcliffe and helped the club to victory in the 1984 FA Cup Final against Watford and to the Football League title the following season. Everton also reached the FA Cup final that season, and won the European Cup Winners Cup in Rotterdam. He also won another League championship medal in 1987. In league matches, he scored an average of one goal every 5.6 matches and in one season, he scored 14 goals in all competitions.

However, his first team chances became limited at Everton following the arrival of Dave Watson in August 1986, and injuries did not help his chances of first team football either.

After appearing in just nine out of 40 First Division games for Everton in 1987–88, a £400,000 fee took him to newly promoted Aston Villa in June 1988. He was a regular in the Villa defence for the next three years, helping secure their First Division survival in 1988–89. In 1989–90, it looked as though Mountfield would add another league title medal to the two he won with Everton, as Villa topped the First Division on several occasions, but eventually they finished second behind champions Liverpool.

However, the appointment of Ron Atkinson as Villa manager in June 1991 signalled a new era at Villa Park, and Mountfield was not part of Atkinson's plans as he bought Shaun Teale to partner Paul McGrath in the centre of defence, and Mountfield made just two more appearances for Villa before joining Wolverhampton Wanderers in November 1991.

He stayed for three and a half years, playing 80 league games, but after 1994 his career was spent outside the top two tiers of English football. He first spent a season with Carlisle United, helping them win promotion to Division Two as Division Three champions, before a brief spell at Northampton Town.

He then began a spell as player, coach and captain of Walsall. Indeed, such was the measure of respect he was held in by many at the club, he was one of the favourites to replace Jan Sorensen as manager in the summer of 1998. However, the job went to former Aston Villa winger Ray Graydon, and Mountfield left the club to pursue his managerial ambitions.

His final club as a player was Scarborough, and he played six Division Three games for them late in the 1998–99 season, but was unable to prevent their relegation from the Football League.

=== International ===
Mountfield was selected to participate in the 1984 UEFA European Under-21 Football Championship. He made his début at Bramall Lane in the second leg of the final versus Spain which England won 2–0. England beat Spain 3–0 on aggregate. It was the only England U21 cap that Mountfield received. He represented England at 'B' level later in his career.

== Managerial career ==
In 2000, League of Ireland team Cork City appointed former Shelbourne boss Colin Murphy as successor to Dave Barry. Murphy stayed for one Super Cup game before departing to Leicester City. In the lurch, facing a UEFA Cup tie against Lausanne Sports, the club brought in Mountfield. He had a turbulent ride in his first managerial appointment, the team lacking consistency, goals and luck. After relative success in preceding seasons crowds again dwindled as the team struggled and the increasingly unpopular Mountfield was sacked in January, after just six months in charge and a 4–0 defeat at home to St Patrick's Athletic.

== Honours ==
Everton

- Football League First Division: 1984–85, 1986–87
- FA Cup: 1983–84; runner-up: 1984–85, 1985–86
- FA Charity Shield: 1984, 1985
- UEFA Cup Winners' Cup: 1984–85
- Football League Cup runner-up: 1983–84

Carlisle United

- Football League Third Division: 1994–95
- Football League Trophy runner-up: 1994–95
