= Philip Carter =

Former director of Everton Football Club

Sir Philip Carter CBE
- Born: 8 May 1927; Glasgow, Scotland
- Died: 23 April 2015 (aged 87)
- Occupation: Life president
- Known for: Everton FC chairman, FA League president
- Predecessor: Peter Moores
- Successor: Bill Kenwright

Sir Philip David Carter, CBE (8 May 1927 – 23 April 2015) was a football director, life president of Everton Football Club and former director of Littlewoods.

== Background ==
Born at 33 Cedric Road, Glasgow, the son of Percival Carter (1895–1956), customs and excise officer, and his first wife, who was from Glasgow, Isabella Smith (Isobel), née Stirratt, (1897–1931). His parents had married in Liverpool on 23 December 1920. After his mother's death, Carter's father moved back to the city, where in 1938 he married Elsie Alexandra Jones (1902–1974). Shortly after his family moved back to Liverpool, Carter visited Everton Football Club's Goodison Park home for the first time.

He attended Waterloo Grammar School in Waterloo, Liverpool.

== Career ==
After National Service in the RAF from 1945 to 1947, Carter joined Littlewoods in 1948. Carter's business acumen was soon recognized by Littlewoods founder John Moores, who became his mentor. Carter later became a store manager, then a senior buyer, and was appointed to the main board by Moores in 1965. In 1976 Moores made Carter managing director, a position he held until taking early retirement in 1983. On 18 August 1995 he was appointed chairman of Forminster plc.

== Everton ==
He has had three spells with Everton Football Club. His first began in July 1975 when he joined the board of directors, after being invited by John Moores. Two years later Carter became vice-chairman after Moores retired from the board. In August 1978 he replaced Bill Scott as chairman.

In February 1979 Trevor Francis become British football's first £1 million footballer. Asked why Everton hadn't competed for the forward's signature, Carter replied: ‘Everyone was of the opinion that Francis was a first-class player, myself included, but we felt that a million pounds was a ridiculous price for anyone … I am certain the board and myself would not condone that sort of irresponsible behaviour’.

Carter was involved with the formation of the Premier League. He along with four others were invited to dinner with ITV to discuss a break-away league that would feature the five largest clubs in the country (Arsenal, Everton, Liverpool, Manchester United and Tottenham Hotspur) more frequently than any other teams thus those five clubs would receive more money than the others. He responded favourably.

While Carter was chairman of Everton, he oversaw some of their greatest successes, including the 1984 FA Cup triumph, the European Cup Winners' Cup glory of 1985, as well as two league championships (the first in 1985, the second in 1987). On 31 October 1987, he famously disowned a host of Everton fans who were making racist chants at Liverpool winger John Barnes in a First Division Merseyside derby at Goodison Park. His condemnation of the club's racist supporters ("Stay Away You Scum") made the front page of several national newspapers. Carter said, "We do not need this kind of nonsense. If people cannot control themselves the message is very simple – stay away because we do not want you here. It is incredible to think that 60,000 people can enjoy a game and yet a few mindless idiots can attempt to spoil it."

When Peter Johnson purchased the club in late 1993, Carter vacated his position only to be asked to return for a second spell by Johnson's buyer Bill Kenwright in 1998 where he remained in the position for six years before opting to retire, aged 77.

In 2008, he was brought back to the board of directors for a second time by Bill Kenwright, this time because an Extraordinary General Meeting had been called and there were not enough available directors to attend (a minimum of three is needed) following the resignation of Keith Wyness. Carter voiced his approval of Everton FC relocating out of the city of Liverpool.

He was awarded a CBE in the 1982 New Years Honours List and later a knighthood in the 1991 Queen's Birthday Honours List.

== Personal life ==
Carter married Harriet Rita Evans (1925 - 2021), a machinist at a glove factory, at St Edmund's Roman Catholic Church, Waterloo, Liverpool, on 25 May 1946. They had two daughters, Gillian and Philippa, and a son, Terence.

== Death ==
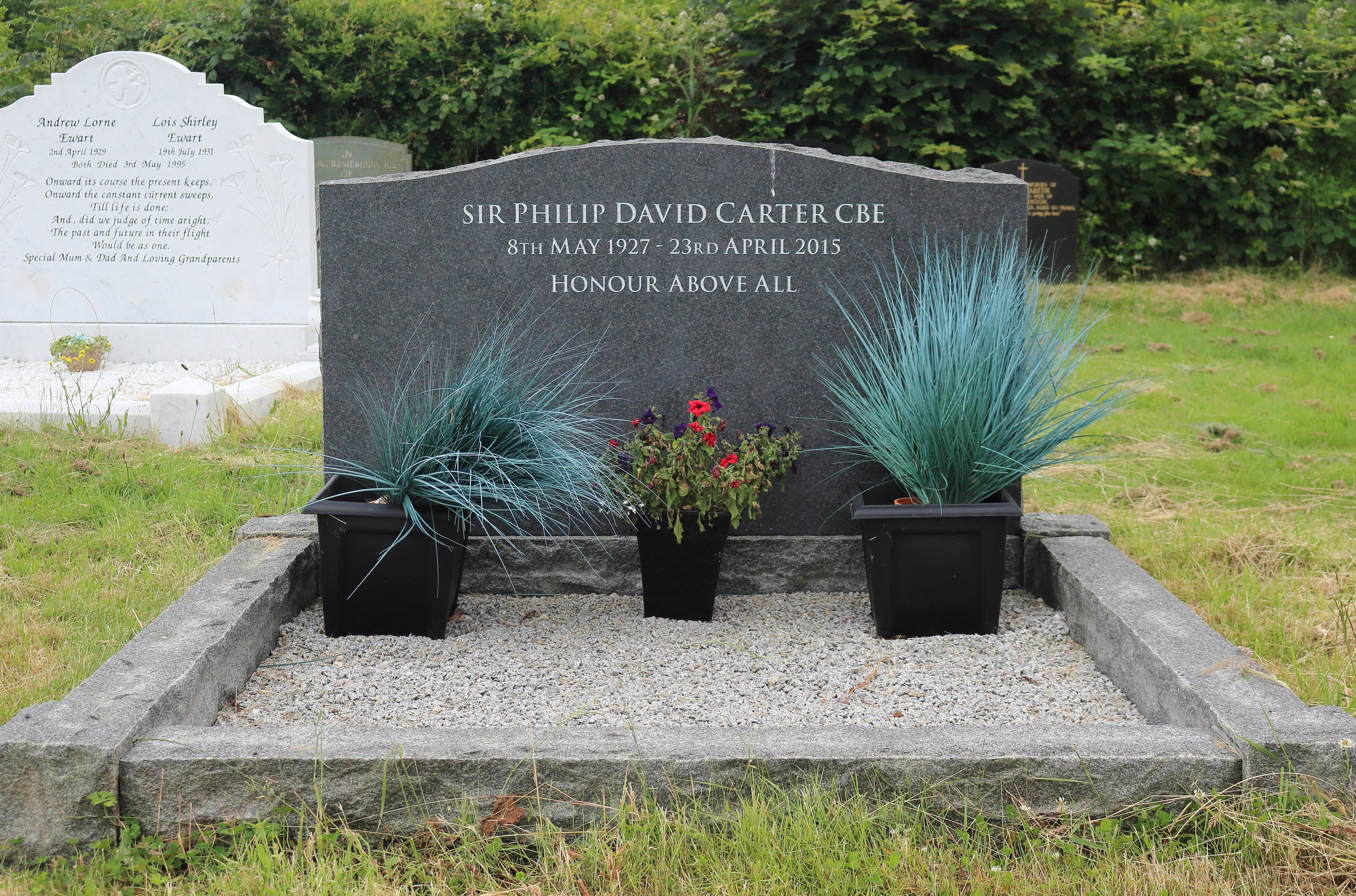
Grave in Frankby Cemetery

On 23 April 2015, Carter died at his home in Noctorum Road, Birkenhead, after a battle against liver cancer which had been diagnosed the previous year.
