= Alan Harper (footballer) =

English footballer

Personal information
- Date of birth: 1 November 1960 (age 65)
- Place of birth: Liverpool, England
- Positions: Full-back; central defender; central midfielder

Team information
- Current team: Liverpool (HeadScout)

Youth career
- Liverpool

Senior career*
Years	Team	Apps	(Gls)
1978–1983	Liverpool	0	(0)
1983–1988	Everton	103	(4)
1988–1989	Sheffield Wednesday	32	(0)
1989–1991	Manchester City	46	(1)
1991–1993	Everton	45	(0)
1993–1994	Luton Town	40	(1)
1994–1996	Burnley	30	(0)
1995	→ Cardiff City (loan)	5	(0)
Total		301	(6)

International career
1978	England Youth	1	(0)
- * Club domestic league appearances and goals

Alan Harper (born 1 November 1960, in Liverpool) is an English former professional footballer who played in the Football League and Premier League for Everton, Sheffield Wednesday, Manchester City, Luton Town, Burnley and Cardiff City. Harper is best remembered for playing in the Championship winning Everton side of the mid-1980s.

Harper was a utility player whose first-choice position was right-back but he could perform competently in almost any position on the park and he frequently turned up in central defence, at left-back, centre midfield, wide midfield and sometimes even as a makeshift striker. Perhaps partially as a result of his great versatility however, he often found himself used as a squad player rather than as a first-team regular at many of the clubs he played for. He is remembered as a largely unspectacular but solid and reliable performer who very rarely made a mistake. Harper scored few goals but many of those he did score were spectacular efforts, often from long range. Everton fans nicknamed him 'Bertie Bassett' because he played in 'allsorts of positions'.

== Career ==
Harper started out at Liverpool in the late 1970s, the club he had supported as a boy, but he never made a first team appearance for Liverpool before Howard Kendall took him across Stanley Park to Everton in the summer of 1983 for £100,000. Harper initially became first choice right-back but after a few months he lost his place to Gary Stevens, who went on to become an England international. From then on, Harper never really held down a regular first team place at Goodison but like Kevin Richardson, he became a vital squad player, filling in for various positions on the park when first-teamers were injured and frequently appearing as a substitute. During his first season, Harper scored a spectacular goal against his previous club Liverpool in the Merseyside derby at Goodison. Everton went on that season to finish runners-up to Liverpool in the League Cup before winning the FA Cup at Wembley in May, beating Graham Taylor's Watford 2–0. Harper was an unused substitute at Wembley and he received a cup winners medal as a result.

The following season, 1984/85, Everton won the League Championship and the UEFA Cup Winners' Cup as well as finishing runners-up in the FA Cup to Manchester United. This was the most successful season in Everton's history and Harper played an important role as a squad player - he received both a Championship winners medal and Cup Winners' Cup medal (again he was an unused substitute in the final). Everton were not allowed to contest the following season's UEFA Champions League due to the ban on English clubs entering European competition after the Heysel Stadium disaster involving Liverpool F.C.

The following year Everton were runners-up to rivals Liverpool in both the League Championship and the FA Cup - Harper came on as a substitute in the FA Cup semi-final against Sheffield Wednesday and scored Everton's opening goal with an audacious lob from outside the area. Then in 1986/87, Everton reclaimed the league title and Harper received his second Championship medal after playing in the majority of Everton's games due to an injury crisis in the first half of the season. Harper scored a vital and spectacular winner at Chelsea during the title run-in.

Howard Kendall then left Everton to join Athletic Bilbao and a year later in 1988 Harper left Everton for Sheffield Wednesday in search of regular first-team football. Wednesday paid £275,000 for Harper's services but after a fairly unremarkable spell at Hillsborough, he rejoined Howard Kendall at his new club Manchester City in December 1989 for a fee of £150,000 and he became City's regular right-back. Kendall returned to Everton the following autumn and in the summer of 1991 he took Harper back to Goodison for £200,000. After two more seasons with the Toffees, Harper left top-flight football to play for Luton Town in 1993 and a year later he joined Burnley. After two seasons at Turf Moor, Harper retired from professional football.

After retirement, Harper went back to Everton once more in the early 2000s as a youth coach, spending several years there before leaving in 2005.

In November 2007 he was employed as a scout by Premier League side Bolton Wanderers who were looking for a number of former professionals to head their recruitment drive led by former Everton manager Colin Harvey.

In October 2010 he left Bolton to join first club Liverpool and was given a senior role under then Reds manager Roy Hodgson.

== Honours ==
Everton

- Football League First Division: 1984–85, 1986–87
- FA Cup: 1983–84; runner-up: 1984–85
- European Cup Winners' Cup: 1984–85
- Football League Cup runner-up: 1983–84
