= History of Everton F.C. =

History of an English football club

Everton Football Club is a football team that plays in the English Premier League. The club's roots loosely lie with a Methodist New Connexion congregation who had a chapel on the corner of Breckfield Road North and St. Domingo Vale in Everton, Liverpool. Initially formed as St. Domingo FC, named after the chapel, the football team was renamed Everton in 1879 after the district of Everton. Since then, Everton have won the Cup Winners' Cup, the league title 9 times and the FA Cup 5 times. They were the first club to play over 100 seasons in the top division of English footballs, achieving this in the 2002–03 season, and the 2026–27 season is their 124th.

== Foundation ==
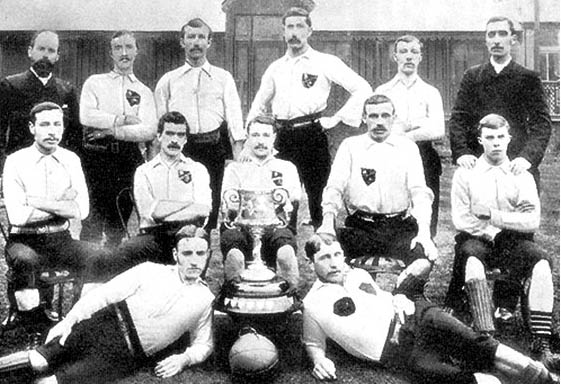
One of the first Everton FC teams, 1878

St. Domingo Methodist New Connexion Chapel was opened in 1871 in Breckfield Road North, Everton, Liverpool. The chapel took its name from its location on the corner of Breckfield Road North and St. Domingo Vale. St. Domingo related addresses in Everton have their origins in St. Domingo House, a building built in 1758 by West Indies trader and sugar boiler George Campbell who would frequent the Colony of Santo Domingo and later became Mayor of Liverpool in 1763. In 1877 Rev. Ben Swift Chambers was appointed Minister of St. Domingo Chapel. He created a cricket team for the youngsters in the area but, as cricket was only played in summer, there was room for another sport during winter. Thus a football club called St. Domingo's F.C. was formed in 1878, the club's first match being a 1–0 home victory over Everton Church Club.

Many people not attending the chapel were interested in joining the football club so it was decided that the name should be changed. In November 1879 at a meeting in the Queen's Head Hotel, the team’s name was changed to Everton Football Club, after the surrounding area. Barker and Dobson, a local sweet manufacturer, introduced "Everton Mints" to honour the club. The district is also the location of the team's crest image, Everton Lock-Up, sometimes referred to locally by the nickname Prince Rupert's Tower.

Everton originally played at Anfield on an open pitch in the southeast corner of the newly laid out Stanley Park, the same site for the once proposed new Liverpool F.C. stadium. The first official match under the name Everton F.C. took place in 1879 against St. Peters with Everton winning 6–0. John Houlding's house backed onto the park and was attracted to the club that attracted large crowds.

Professional clubs required proper enclosed facilities. In 1882, a Mr J. Cruit donated land at Priory Road which became the club's home for two years, with proper hoarding and turnstiles. Mr Cruit asked the club to leave his land as the crowds became far too large and noisy. Everton moved to nearby Anfield in 1884, renting from John Orrell, a friend of Houlding. Proper covered stands were built. Houlding bought Anfield 1 year after Everton moved in, Everton initially making a donation to a local hospital in lieu of rent before paying rent to their own president.

Within seven years of moving to Anfield the club had converted the ground from a brick field to a 20,000 plus international standard ground with accommodation on all sides. The club rose from amateur to professional, hosting an international match, England vs. Ireland, founder members of the Football League and winning their first title. The club's income rose substantially.

== Football League founders ==
In 1888, Everton became founder members of the Football League, finishing 8th in the first season and 2nd in the following season.

=== First League title ===
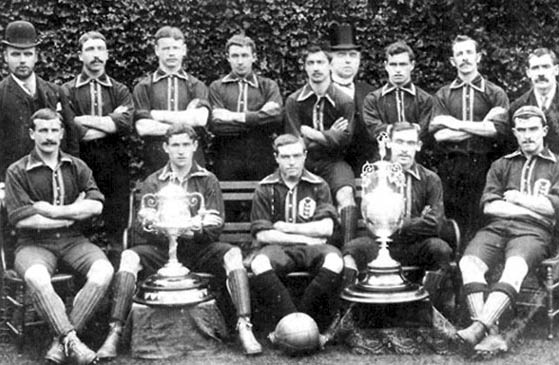
The team that won the first league title in 1891

The 1890–91 season started in superb form with 5 straight wins, with Fred Geary scoring in each of the first 6 games. By mid-January, Everton had completed all but 1 of their fixtures and were on 29 points, while Preston North End were 11 points adrift with 7 games still to play. Everton than had to sit out the next 2 months as Preston completed their fixture list until they were only 2 points adrift with one match each left to play. Both teams played their final games of the season on 14 March, with Everton losing 3–2 at Burnley (Geary scoring both Everton goals) and Preston losing 3–0 at Sunderland. Everton were thus able to win the Football League Championship for the first time, by a margin of 2 points with 14 wins in their 22 league games. Geary had been ever-present and was the club's top goal-scorer with 21 goals.

=== Move to Goodison Park ===
In the early 20th century, rivals Liverpool and Everton produced a joint matchday programme. This example is from April 1910.

After winning the league for the first time, the Everton Committee and President John Houlding became embroiled in deep and bitter conflict. Houlding originally rented Anfield from the Orrell family and sublet to Everton FC. In 1885 Houlding bought the land from Orrel and rented directly to Everton FC. The Liberal-leaning committee viewed Conservative councillor Houlding as having a personal financial and political agenda and there was disagreement over the club's business model and the issue of selling refreshments, to which Houlding had sole rights. Houlding had increased the club's rent by 150% after the 1889–90 season to £250 per annum. John Orrell, who owned the adjacent land, then attempted to legally run a road through the new main stand to access his land. This would require Everton to buy both Anfield and Orrell's land or to rent both. Everton committee members accused Houlding of knowing of the legal right of way and allowing the new stand to be built. The committee wanted Houlding to negotiate on the combined Anfield and Orrell's land rent of £370 or the purchase of both, but were told the rental fee was non-negotiable. Houlding refused to give Everton FC a contractual rental lease. The governance issue was compounded by the overt political disagreements held between the Houlding faction (most of whom were involved in the city's Conservative Party) and the 'dissenters' on the club committee (which contained men actively involved in Liberal politics in the north end of Liverpool). The backdrop for the dispute within the club was the struggle for power in the city council chambers between a previously dominant Tory Party struggling to hang onto political control of Liverpool and a resurgent local Liberal Party, and there is a clear sense that the club dispute was caught up in that struggle and added to it.

Houlding attempted to hijack the club by incorporating another company, The Everton Football Club and Athletic Grounds Limited in January 1892 and seeking to get it registered as the official club in March 1892. Everton were still occupying and playing at Anfield, and Houlding sought to take over Everton's fixtures and position in the Football League. The Football League would not recognise Houlding's new company as Everton, resulting in his changing the name to Liverpool F.C. and Athletic Grounds Ltd in June 1892, creating Liverpool F.C. The distrust between Houlding and the Everton Committee resulted in Everton abandoning their substantial ground at Anfield and moving to Goodison Park on the north side of Stanley Park, issuing 5,000 shares as they did so, giving the directors a 6% stake in the club. Everton played their last match at Anfield on 18 April 1892 vs. Bolton Wanderers A new company, The Everton Football Club Limited, was incorporated on 14 June 1892.

=== FA Cup ===
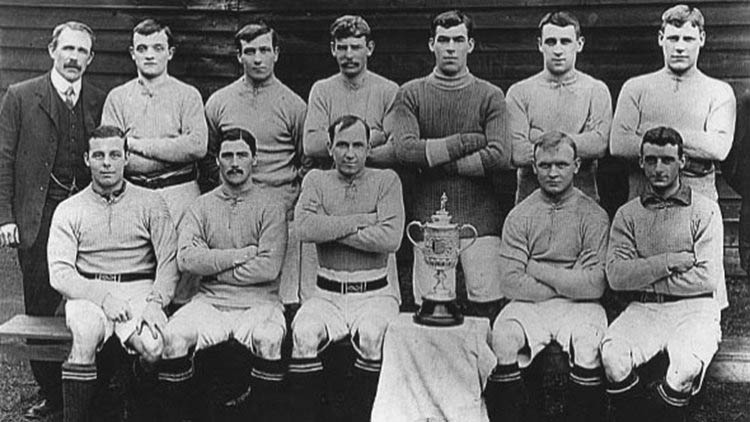
The team that won the 1906 FA Cup Final

Following the move to Goodison Park Everton reached four FA Cup finals before the First World War, losing 1–0 against Wolverhampton Wanderers at Fallowfield Stadium, Manchester on 26 March 1893 and 3–2 against Aston Villa at Crystal Palace on 10 April 1897 before winning at their third attempt on 20 April 1906 against Newcastle United again at Crystal Palace. Everton then reached their second successive final on 20 April 1907, however, finished in a 2–1 defeat to Sheffield Wednesday.

=== Champions again ===
1914–15 was to be the final season before league football was suspended for the duration of the First World War. Everton won their second league title, 1 point ahead of Oldham Athletic, with Bobby Parker finishing the season as the leagues' top scorer on 35 goals.

== Interwar years: Dean and co. ==
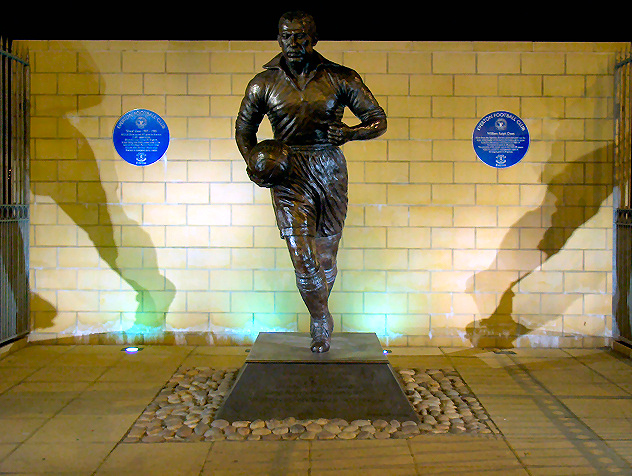
Statue of Dixie Dean outside Goodison Park

William Ralph Dean, better known as "Dixie" Dean, was one of the greatest goal scorers that the English game has seen. After averaging a goal a match for Tranmere Rovers, prolific striker Dean was lured across the River Mersey to play for Everton. In his first season for Everton, the 1925–26 season, Dean netted 32 league goals in 38 matches, scoring his first brace on his debut. The following season, he scored 21 goals in 27 matches.

=== Sixty ===
Making history in 1927–28, Dean scored 60 league goals in 39 matches, setting a record that has stood ever since and almost single-handedly gave Everton the league title.

In a bizarre turn of events, in the 1929–30 season Everton finished last in the First Division being relegated to the Second Division. Dean was on top form in the secondary league, scoring 39 goals in 37 matches and lifting Everton to promotion at the first attempt as Second Division champions.

The following season, 1931–32, Dean scored 45 goals as Everton won their 4th league title.

In 1933, Everton won the FA Cup, with Dean becoming Everton's first-ever number 9 in the 3–0 final win against Manchester City. In this match, numbers were worn for the first time. The number 9 would become synonymous with commanding and high-scoring strikers at domestic and international level football, something Dean embodied.

He played his last game for Everton on 11 December 1937. Dean died at a Merseyside derby at Goodison Park in 1980, leaving behind a legacy of 383 goals in 433 matches overall.

In the 1938–39 season, Everton, with Joe Mercer, T. G. Jones and Tommy Lawton won the Football League Championship again. Lawton scored 35 goals during the season at the age of 19. The outbreak of World War II interrupted the players' careers for 6 years, bringing a halt to a team which otherwise may have achieved much more, exactly the same scenario as season 1914–15.

== 1940s–1950s: the barren years ==
Chart showing the progress of Everton F.C. through the English football league system from the inaugural season in 1888–89 to the present

Although the 1990s have been regarded as a poor decade, this era was worse. The great 1938–39 championship-winning team was quickly split up in 1946. Tommy Lawton was sold to Chelsea, Joe Mercer disagreed with the manager Theo Kelly and was sold to Arsenal and they tried to sell T. G. Jones to Roma. Soon, only goalkeeper Ted Sagar was left.

Under the management of the uninspired and under-financed Cliff Britton, Everton were relegated after the 1950–51 season for only the second time in their history to the Second Division. This time it took 3 seasons before Everton were promoted in 1953–54 as runners-up. The final game of the season decided promotion with Everton beating Oldham Athletic away 4–0.

The era nevertheless had some notable players such as Dave Hickson, Bobby Collins and Brian Harris. Memorable matches included ending Manchester United's long unbeaten run at Old Trafford with a 5–2 win in 1956.

Everton did reach the FA Cup semi-finals twice, in 1950, losing to Liverpool and 1953, losing to Bolton Wanderers 4–3.

== Harry Catterick era (1961–1973) ==
Honours won: First Division (1963), (1970), Charity Shield (1963), (1970), FA Cup (1966)

Runners up: Charity Shield (1966), FA Cup (1968)

The 1960s is regarded by many fans as the golden era of Everton Football Club. During this period they won the League Championship and Charity Shield twice (both in 1963 and 1970), and one FA Cup (in 1966). After the barren period of the 1950s, former player Harry Catterick took charge of Everton in April 1961 and Everton finished 5th in the league in the 1960–61 season. The team were soon to be dubbed the "School of Science" after their methodical approach in the tradition of the Everton team in the 1920s who were first given this name. Their football was inventive and flowing similar to Tottenham's "Push and Run" style. In Catterick's first full season as manager Everton conceded fewer goals than any other team and finished 4th.

=== Champions ===
The following season, the Toffees lost just 6 of their 42 matches and took the title, Everton's sixth. The striking partnership of Roy Vernon and the "Golden Vision" Alex Young scoring 46 goals between them (the last time two Everton players have scored more than 20 league goals each in one season). Other notable players included Billy Bingham, Jimmy Gabriel, Derek Temple, Bobby Collins and Brian Labone.

=== Trebilcock and Temple ===
In 1966, the same year the English national team won the World Cup, Everton won the FA Cup in a classic game, after overturning a two-goal deficit against Sheffield Wednesday in the final to win 3–2. Everton reached the final again in 1968, but were unable to overcome West Bromwich Albion at Wembley. The following year Everton progressed to the semi-finals at Villa Park, but lost 1–0 to Manchester City.

=== The "Holy Trinity" ===
A year later in the 1969–70 season, Everton won the Championship again thanks in part to the scoring sensation of Joe Royle, who would later manage the club to FA Cup and Charity Shield success in 1995. The success of the team could be seen from the number of points won (one short of the record) and 9 clear of Leeds United. The team won the league in style, playing what was virtually a form of Total Football orchestrated by the "Holy Trinity" midfield of Howard Kendall, Alan Ball and Colin Harvey. With Labone at centre-half and club captain and Royle up front, this is regarded by many fans as the club's finest side ever.

Harry Catterick's team of the 1969–70 season seemed destined for greatness, but declined quickly. In the 1970–71 season, Everton did not recapture their league form but did progress on two cup fronts. For only the second time, Everton played in the European Cup reaching the quarter-finals but were knocked out by Greek side Panathinaikos on the away goals rule. The previous weekend Everton took on neighbours Liverpool in the FA Cup semi final but lost 2–1.

Everton finished 14th in the 1970–71 season, 15th in the 1971–72 season and 17th in the 1972–73 season. The stress of an under-performing team was said to be a factor in Harry Catterick's poor health and eventual resignation in April 1973.

== Billy Bingham and Gordon Lee era (1973–1981) ==
Gordon Lee Honours: Football League Cup Runners-up: (1977)

After a 7th place finish in 1973–74, Everton were on course to win the Championship again in the 1974–75 season under Billy Bingham, another former Everton player (some bookmakers had even stopped taking bets at Easter), but some surprising losses to lower placed teams ended the challenge and they finished 4th. After two relatively mid-table seasons (11th and 9th), Bingham left in early 1977.

During the interregnum, Everton reached their first League Cup final, with Aston Villa, and the FA Cup Semi final, against Liverpool. In the League Cup Everton and Aston Villa drew the final at Wembley and drew the replay at Hillsborough, before Everton lost late in extra time of the second replay at Old Trafford. The FA Cup Semi final was a draw, by the scoreline of 2–2 but the match will always be remembered for the goal by Bryan Hamilton that was disallowed. Everton lost the replay 3–0.

Under Gordon Lee, Everton finished 3rd in 1977–78 (Bob Latchford topped the first division scoring chart with 30 goals) and 4th in 1978–79, after yet again looking serious title contenders for much of these seasons. However, the expectations were high given the success of Liverpool across the park and finishes of 19th in 1979–80 and 15th in 1980–81, too close to the relegation zone for comfort, led to Lee getting sacked. Everton did reach the FA Cup Semi-final in the 1979–80 season, drawing with Second Division West Ham, but lost the replay 2–1.

== Howard Kendall era (1981–1987) ==
Honours won: FA Cup (1984), Charity Shield (1984), (1985), (1986 shared) European Cup Winners Cup (1985), First Division (1985), (1987)

Runners-up: Milk Cup (1984), FA Cup (1985), First Division (1986), FA Cup (1986)

Former Everton player Howard Kendall returned to the club as manager for the 1981–82 season, having won promotion from the Third Division with Blackburn Rovers and taken them within a whisker of a second successive promotion. Kendall's reign got off to a promising start with a 3–1 win over Birmingham City on the opening day of the season, and they finished 8th in the First Division. Their steady progress continued into 1982–83, as they finished 7th and only narrowly missed out on a UEFA Cup place. The only real letdown that season was a 0–5 home defeat against rivals Liverpool on 6 November 1982.

During the first 3 seasons after his appointment as Everton manager, Kendall brought many young players like Neville Southall, Gary Stevens, Derek Mountfield, Peter Reid, Kevin Sheedy and Trevor Steven, with Kevin Ratcliffe and Graeme Sharp already at the club. Many other players would also be signed, but the most significant purchase in late 1983 was Andy Gray. Everton hoped to bring in some success having been massively overshadowed since the early 1970s by neighbouring Liverpool.

1983–84 was a trying season in the league, with Everton being in the bottom half of the First Division for the first half of the season and fans making continued calls for Kendall to be sacked, but a great form in the second half of the season saw Everton achieve a 7th-place finish once again. Everton, were however progressing on the cup fronts. Reaching their second League Cup final, now known as the Milk Cup, the Blues drew 0–0 with Liverpool at Wembley, but eventually lost the replay. The FA Cup though was the silver lining, with Everton winning the final 2–0 against Watford to win their first trophy, since the 1970 Charity Shield. This was the fourth time Everton won the FA Cup.

=== 1984–85 ===
Everton won their 8th league title with 5 matches to spare. Once again though, Everton were progressing on two cup fronts. In Europe, Everton reached their first European final after defeating German giants Bayern Munich 3–1 at Goodison, in the European Cup Winners' Cup, after the first leg ended 0–0. The match is regarded as one of the most memorable in the club's history. The final against Rapid Vienna was also won 3–1, as Everton clinched their first-ever European trophy.

In the FA Cup, Everton reached their second successive FA Cup Final. Having already won the league, and having just won the Cup Winners Cup three days earlier, Everton set their minds on a treble. At Wembley, in the final, a tired Everton lost 1–0 to Manchester United. Had they not lost, Everton would have joined Liverpool as only the second English team to win 3 major trophies in one season.

The 1984–85 season was not without its controversy. The Heysel Stadium disaster, during which 39 fans of Juventus were killed and 14 fans of Liverpool were convicted of manslaughter, consequently resulted in English clubs being banned from European Competition by UEFA.

The 1985 close season saw the acquisition of 24-year-old striker Gary Lineker from Leicester City, with Lineker's arrival sparking the controversial departure of the hugely popular Andy Gray, who returned to Aston Villa.

=== Double runners up ===
1985–86, even without European action, would be another exciting season for Everton. By the end of September, it looked as though Manchester United would be champions of the First Division after winning the first 10 games of the campaign, while Everton were in 5th place and stood 13 points adrift of Manchester United and also had Liverpool, Chelsea and Newcastle United above them. However, United's excellent form gradually tailed off and Everton went top of the league on 1 February 1986 thanks to a 1–0 win at home against Tottenham Hotspur. After this, Everton looked on course to retain the title for most of the remaining season, although Liverpool and surprise contenders West Ham United kept on Everton's heels for the following months. However, a 0–0 draw against Nottingham Forest followed by a shock 1–0 defeat to Division One newcomers Oxford United on 30 April resulted in Everton being unseated from the top spot by Liverpool, with only 3 games remaining. Unfortunately, their defence of the title was ended on 3 May 1986 as Liverpool's last league game of the season left the title out of Everton's reach, despite Everton crushing Southampton 6–1 at Goodison Park on the same day. However, Everton did win the race for second place by defeating fellow contenders West Ham 3–1 on the final day of the league season. On 10 May 1986, they took on Liverpool in the first all-Merseyside FA Cup final. A first-half goal by Gary Lineker, his 40th of the season, suggested that the FA Cup would be heading to the blue half of Merseyside, but 2 goals form Ian Rush and a goal from Craig Johnston saw Liverpool win the trophy to complete the double, while Everton only won the Charity Shield that season.

Had UEFA decided to lift the ban on English teams in European competitions at the end of that season (though the ban on all clubs was indefinite, it was reviewed at the end of every season), then Everton would have entered the Cup Winners' Cup, but UEFA voted for the ban to continue for at least another season and so there would be no European action for English clubs for the second season running.

The 1986 close season saw Everton sell leading goalscorer Gary Lineker to Barcelona of Spain, and the arrival of defender Dave Watson from Norwich City, while midfielder Adrian Heath switched to the role of Graeme Sharp's strike partner.

=== Champions again ===
The 1986–87 campaign began in a familiar fashion, with Everton and Liverpool being firmly among the contenders, though this time there some unlikely other teams also in contention, including Norwich City and Coventry City. By Christmas, Everton were 4th in the league (level with 3rd placed Liverpool) and a point behind second-placed Nottingham Forest, while a resurgent Arsenal were 6 points ahead of them at the top of the league. However, a 3–1 win over Coventry City on 7 February 1987 sent Everton to top of the league, and they clinched the league title on 4 May 1987 with a 1–0 win over Norwich City at Carrow Road.

The European ban on English clubs continued, so Everton would not be able to compete in the European Cup in the 1987–88 season.

During the 1987 close season, Howard Kendall left to Spain to become coach of Athletic Bilbao and was replaced as manager at Everton by his assistant Colin Harvey.

== Colin Harvey era (1987–1990) ==
Honours won: Charity Shield (1987)

Runners-up: Simod Cup (1989), FA Cup (1989)

Colin Harvey's first season as manager brought a 4th-place finish. During the 1988 close season Everton made one of the first £2million signings in English football when they signed 23-year-old striker Tony Cottee from West Ham United. Harvey also signed midfielder Stuart McCall from Bradford City that summer.

Despite Cottee scoring a hat-trick on his debut against Newcastle United and going on to be one of the most highly rated frontmen to wear an Everton shirt, Everton's league fortunes were mixed in 1988–89 as they finished 8th in the league. Everton did return to Wembley twice, in April for the Full Members Cup final only to lose out to Nottingham Forest and in May in the FA Cup final, losing 3–2 to Liverpool in extra-time, in a game somewhat overshadowed by the Hillsborough disaster in Liverpool's semi-final.

Following the disappointments of that season and with the gulf between Everton and their rivals across Stanley Park widening again, Harvey dipped into the transfer market that summer and signed midfielder Norman Whiteside from Manchester United and striker Mike Newell from Leicester City, while right-winger Trevor Steven was sold to Rangers.

The 1989–90 season began well for Everton, who were at the top of the league for 2 weeks in late autumn. There was extra incentive for title glory this season, as UEFA had vowed to lift the ban on English clubs in European competitions for the following season provided England fans behaved well at the World Cup. However, Everton were unable to regain the lead of the league that they had lost in early November and finished 6th in the league table.

On 31 October 1990, Everton occupied the 18th of 20 places in the First Division. Only the bottom 2 clubs would be going down this season, as the top flight would be expanding to 22 clubs for 1991–92. However, it was still Everton's worst start to a league season until the 1994–95 season and manager Colin Harvey paid for these shortcomings with his job.

== Return of Howard Kendall (1990–1993) ==
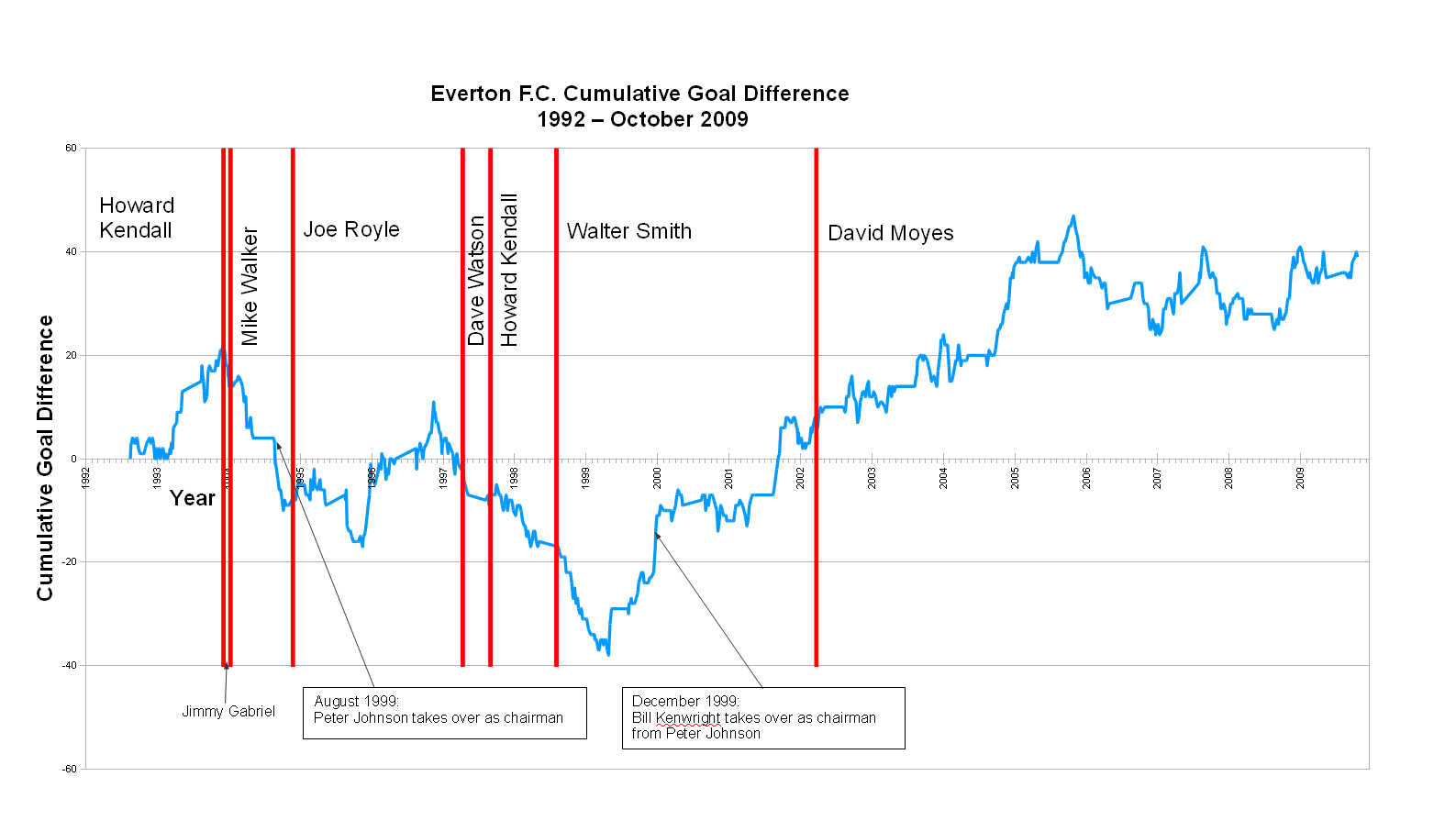
Chart showing the cumulative goal difference of Everton under different managers from the inaugural season of The Premier League to 25 October 2009

Runners-up: Zenith Data Systems Cup (1991)

Everton had struggled in the first few months of the 1990–91 season and manager Colin Harvey was sacked. The club sought to bring back Howard Kendall for a second time as manager, and in November Kendall left Manchester City and returned to Everton, along with Harvey who remained as assistant manager. Things had looked liked they had improved when Everton returned to Wembley for the Zenith Data Systems Cup final, only to lose 4–1 in extra time against Crystal Palace. Strong performances in the First Division saw Everton climb out of the relegation zone to see Kendall guide Everton to a 9th-place finish.

The 1991 close season saw the departure of Everton hero Graeme Sharp but the attack was bolstered by Peter Beardsley who was signed from Liverpool and Mo Johnston from Rangers.

Despite these changes to the squad, Everton continued to decline in 1991–92, finishing 12th – their lowest finish for more than a decade. 1992–93 was the first season of the new FA Premier League, which took over from the Football League First Division as the highest division of English football. However, Everton finished 13th and the pressure grew upon Howard Kendall.

The opening stages of the 1993–94 season looked to be the turning point for Howard Kendall in his second spell as Everton manager, as they topped the Premier League after winning their opening 3 games. However, a dismal run of form followed over the next few weeks and Kendall left Everton in early December after they had plummeted down the league to occupy a mid-table position. This was followed by a dismal run of form under caretaker manager Jimmy Gabriel, which saw Everton drop to the fringes of the relegation battle by mid-January.

== Mike Walker era (1994) ==
In January 1994, Everton found a successor to Howard Kendall when they recruited Mike Walker from a Norwich City side that had recently finished third in the Premier League and eliminated Bayern Munich from the UEFA Cup. Everton would later be fined £75,000 by the Premier League for "indirectly inducing" Walker to leave Norwich. He was now faced with a challenge of saving Everton from relegation from a top flight which they had so far been members of for 40 successive seasons and been champions of just 7 years earlier. Results under Walker were initially good, but the team stumbled again in March and hit another horrible run of form and this combined with a freak set of results on the penultimate matchday dumped Everton into the last relegation spot, leaving the club in the unthinkable position of being relegated unless they not only won their last match, but other results went their way as well.

=== The "Great Escape" ===
On the final day of the season Everton needed to beat Wimbledon at Goodison Park in order to stay up. Wimbledon took a 2–0 lead, but Everton pulled off a dramatic escape act thanks to a first half penalty from Graham Stuart, a second half goal from Barry Horne and a late winner again from Stuart to win 3–2 and help send Sheffield United and Oldham Athletic down with already-relegated Swindon Town. Everton made a poor start to the 1994–95 season and were bottom of the league after 14 games, having won just once (and even then not until their 13th match); Walker was sacked in November 1994.

== Joe Royle era (1994–1997) ==
Honours won: FA Cup (1995), Charity Shield (1995)

=== The "Dogs of War" ===
Within days of Walker's sacking, former Everton player Joe Royle had returned to the club as manager after 12 years in charge of Oldham Athletic. His key priority was to save Everton from relegation. He made a few changes to the squad in his first few months as manager, including making striker Duncan Ferguson's loan move permanent for a club record £4 million. Everton confirmed their Premier League survival in the penultimate game of the season when they won 1–0 at already-relegated Ipswich Town.

The major achievement of the team throughout the season came about on the 20th of May 1995 when a goal scored by Paul Rideout helped Everton secure a 1–0 win against Manchester United in the FA Cup final. They were popularly referred to as the "Dogs of War" because they beat the cup defenders and thanks to some vital saves made by goalkeeper Neville Southall.

Royle bolstered Everton's squad for the 1995–96 season, with a club record £5 million move for Manchester United's unsettled Ukrainian winger Andrei Kanchelskis. He was determined to build on the FA Cup glory with a good run in the UEFA Cup Winners' Cup, however runs in the cup competitions were short lived. Everton's league form was vastly improved as they finished 6th and were narrowly pipped to a UEFA Cup place by Arsenal on the final day of the season. It had been a great season for Kanchelskis though, as he scored 16 goals and continued to live up to his reputation as the finest right-winger in the Premier League. However, he defected to Italian club Fiorentina halfway through the next season. Everton slowly fell apart without Kanchelskis, and manager Royle stepped down as manager on 27 March 1997 over a disagreement on transfers and with a relegation battle creeping upon the club. Veteran defender and captain Dave Watson took over as caretaker until the end of the season, helping confirm Everton's survival, but he did not want the job permanently and the hunt was now on for a new manager.

== Third Howard Kendall era (1997–1998) ==
After the end of the 1996–97 season, Everton approached Howard Kendall (by now at Sheffield United) following rejections from Bobby Robson and former striker Andy Gray about a third spell as the club's manager. Kendall returned and there was much hype as the new season began about whether Kendall could still work his old magic and re-establish Everton as one of England's top playing sides. However, the 1997–98 campaign was a difficult one. Like in 1994, Everton's survival was not assured until the last game of the season and only achieving survival on goal difference at the expense of Bolton Wanderers. Off the field, the club was in a major financial crisis at this time which would not be resolved until late 1999.

Kendall's third spell as manager ended in June 1998 when he quit and it seemed likely that chairman Peter Johnson would turn to former Everton player and then Manchester United assistant manager Brian Kidd as his successor, but the job went to Walter Smith instead.

== Walter Smith era (1998–2002) ==
Successful former Rangers manager Walter Smith took over from Kendall in the summer of 1998 and big things were expected along with some high-profile signings but his first season saw another relegation battle, and only a late run of 4 wins from their last 6 games saw them earn safety a 14th-place finish. During the 1998–99 season striker Duncan Ferguson was sold to Newcastle United without Smith's knowledge. The resulting outrage from supporters regarding the manner of the sale lead to chairman Peter Johnson stepping down from his post. Theatrical producer Bill Kenwright bought control of the club and installed Philip Carter as the new chairman. Smith's chances of success were hampered by continuing financial constraints which had also contributed to the club's decline in previous years. 1999–2000 proved to be a better campaign, and the club looked to have an outside chance of qualifying for the UEFA Cup for much of the season. In the reverse of the previous year though, Everton fell apart in the final months of the campaign, claiming just 2 wins from their last 12 games and finishing in 13th, just one place higher than the previous year. 2000–01 saw a major step back however, and the club once again fell into a relegation battle, not helped by long-term injuries to several key players.

In March 2000 American cable television provider NTL approached the club with a view to purchasing a 9.9% stake in the club. Everton expected to announce a deal before the beginning of the 2000–01 season, but by October 2000 any chance of an agreement had disappeared leaving Everton with financial difficulties and forced to sell first team players, including Youth Academy products Francis Jeffers and Michael Ball, to balance the books – the board had already spent £18.4 million on purchasing new players including bringing back Duncan Ferguson, on the basis that an agreement was in place. Around the same time Paul Gregg had been negotiating a deal with United News and Media but this never came to fruition.

The Everton board finally ran out of patience with Smith and he was sacked in March 2002 after an FA Cup exit against Middlesbrough, with Everton still in real danger of relegation.

== David Moyes era (2002–2013) ==
Runners-up: FA Cup (2009)

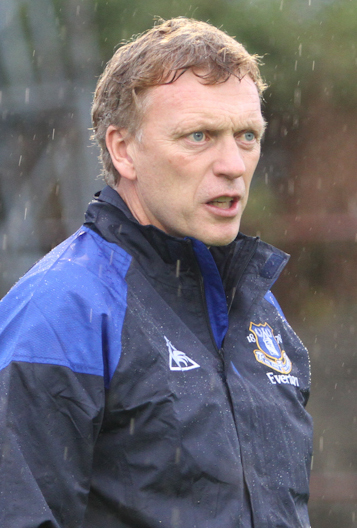
David Moyes managed Everton from 2002 to 2013.

In March 2002, the board turned to promising young Preston North End manager David Moyes with the task of moving Everton forward after years of underachievement, and he was able to steer the club to safety in the last few games of the season, finishing 15th. In Moyes' first full season in charge, Everton finished 7th in the Premiership and just missed out on a UEFA Cup place in a campaign which was dominated by the emergence of brilliant young striker Wayne Rooney, who came to national prominence with a spectacular last-minute winner against league champions Arsenal, becoming the youngest English league goalscorer ever and Everton's youngest ever scorer, and consigning the champions to their first league defeat for almost a year.

The 2002–03 season was Everton's best season since the 1995–96 season when they finished 6th and for a while it had even looked like they would qualify for the Champions League. In the FA Cup the Toffees were on the receiving end of a giant-killing, away to Shrewsbury Town, who were managed by former Everton captain Kevin Ratcliffe and were just four months away from being relegated from the Football League. The following season's league form was a stark contrast, with the club finishing 17th and accumulating only 39 points, the lowest points in a season in the club's history, until the 2022–23 season.

Wayne Rooney handed in a transfer request and was sold to Manchester United in August 2004 for a fee of £23 million, with a potential to rise to £30 million due to bonus payments for league positions, trophies, international caps and 25% excess sell on fees. Despite the loss of Rooney, Everton's 2004–05 season was much more successful and they finished 4th in the table, their highest position since the 1987–88 season, achieving Champions League qualification, ahead of rivals Liverpool. They played some of their finest football in years, thanks greatly to the 4–5–1 tactic of Moyes and the form of Danish midfielder Thomas Gravesen, who was sold to Real Madrid midway through the season and was replaced by Mikel Arteta.

Despite the euphoria of the season and the Champions League qualification, Everton started the 2005–06 season badly, with their Champions League campaign ending in defeat by Villarreal in the qualifying stages after referee Pierluigi Collina controversially disallowed an important Everton goal. After being demoted to the UEFA Cup, they were knocked out by Dinamo București, who thrashed the Toffees 5–1 in Romania.

After occupying the Premier League relegation zone throughout October 2005, Everton stopped Chelsea's 9-game winning run with a 1–1 draw to spark a short revival that saw the team finally start to get good results to put much needed points on the board. However, this was followed by another dismal run including several 4–0 defeats to sides in the bottom half of the table and a one-sided derby match. A 1–0 win against Sunderland on New Year's Eve started a run of 5 straight Premiership wins and 6 games unbeaten including victory against Arsenal – the club's best run of results since the Premiership began which hauled the team away from the relegation zone, and made a top half finish or even Europe a real possibility. This was not to be as the team remained as inconsistent as ever and a disappointing draw on the last day meant an 11th-place finish instead of moving into the top half. Inconsistency and a shortage of goals let Everton down in 2005–06 and ended their hopes of another European campaign.

Everton began the 2006–07 season well, including their first league win at White Hart Lane in 20 years, followed by a 3–0 home win over Liverpool. The club's transfer record was broken with the signing of Andrew Johnson from Crystal Palace. At the end of the season, Everton finished in 6th place and qualified for the following seasons UEFA Cup competition. During the summer of 2007, the club announced the acquisition of a professional basketball team, called the Everton Tigers, and were entered into the British Basketball League as one of three expansion franchises for the 2007–08 season.

In 2007–08, Everton once again broke their transfer record with the signing of Yakubu for £11.25 million from Middlesbrough. The club reached the group stage of the UEFA Cup, where they went on to win all of their games, including against the eventual winners Zenit Saint Petersburg. Having successfully negotiated the next round, Everton were knocked out in the last 16 by Fiorentina on penalties. In the Carling Cup, Everton reached the semi-final for the first time since the 1987–88 season, losing 3–1 to Chelsea on aggregate. Everton spent much of the season in the top 4 of the league, but were eventually overtaken by Liverpool and finished 5th, once again qualifying for the UEFA Cup.

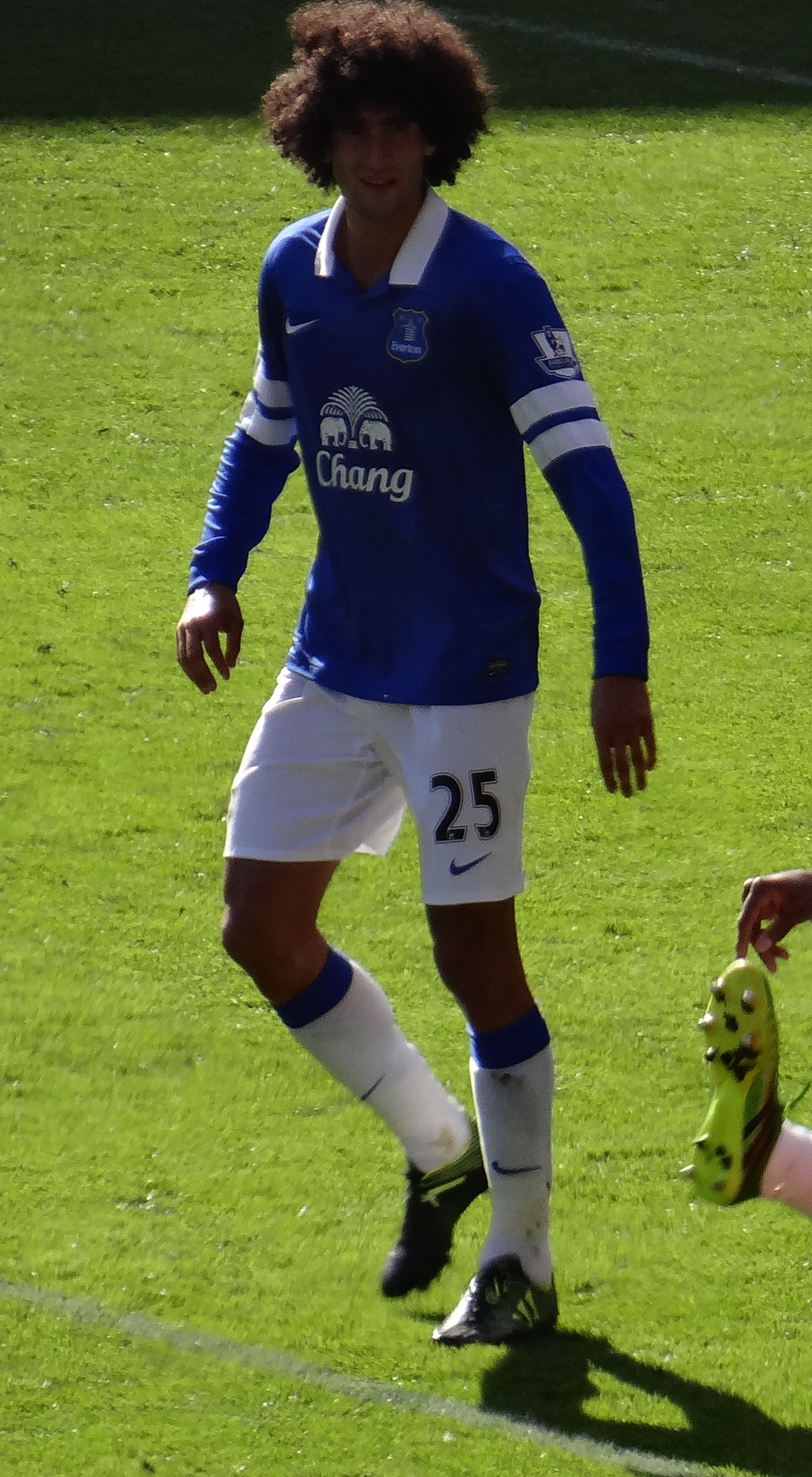
In 2008, Everton signed Marouane Fellaini for a club record £15 million.

The following summer was one of some turmoil for Everton as their failure to gain Government acceptance for their proposed stadium move to Kirkby, the departure of Chief Executive Keith Wyness and the seeming reluctance of David Moyes to sign a new contract increased the gloom amongst supporters. In the last week of the transfer window, the club transfer record was broken with the signing of Marouane Fellaini for £15 million from Standard Liège. Everton failed to qualify for the UEFA Cup group stages, as they were eliminated by Liège, with Fellaini ineligible to play against his former team.

Moyes did eventually sign a new 5-year contract with the club and with it fortunes began to turn. A strong run in November and December (8 wins and 2 draws in 12 league games) propelled the club to the upper reaches of the league table and raised hopes for another top-6 finish.

In early February, Everton played Liverpool 3 times in quick succession, once in the league (a 1–1 draw at Anfield) and twice in the FA Cup, with Everton ultimately proving victorious in the replay at Goodison Park.

Season-ending injuries to Yakubu, Mikel Arteta and Phil Jagielka did not halt Everton's progress and the end of the season saw the team finish in 5th place again in the league on the back of only 3 defeats in 29 games, to qualify for the following seasons Europa League competition. Everton did reach their first FA Cup final since 1995 after knocking out Manchester United on penalties in the semi-final at Wembley, but were overcome by Chelsea and lost 2–1.

The 2009–10 season began with the club losing their opening 2 home games, including a 6–1 home defeat at the hands of Arsenal and after a long period of speculation, defender Joleon Lescott was sold to Manchester City for £22 million. The club qualified for the group stages of the Europa League, but continued to perform poorly in the league. League results improved in December 2009, but Everton were knocked out of Europe over two legs by Sporting CP. At the end of March, they set a club record in the Premier League with 7 consecutive home wins, which included victories over title chasers Chelsea and Manchester United. Everton finished the season in 8th place, just one place and 2 points adrift of neighbours Liverpool and a place in the UEFA Europa League for the following season. It was only the second out of 6 seasons where the Toffees failed to achieve European qualification.

The 2010–11 season began with Everton in poor form. They failed to win a league game until October and had been knocked out of the League Cup by Brentford. However, by the end of that month, the situation had stabilised and they were 7th in the table. Patchy league form ensued through to the new year, but one highlight was an FA Cup 5th round win at Chelsea. A run of only 3 defeats in 18 league games ensured that the club would have its seemingly customary strong finish to the season and by mid-April, the club was 7th in the league, one point behind Liverpool. Everton would go on to finish 7th that season with 54 points, being Everton's lowest points tally in 5 years.

The 2011–12 season saw Everton get off to their now customary sluggish start and they were struggling in 16th place at the beginning of November. The turn of the year, and the signing of Nikica Jelavić from Rangers, saw fortunes improve dramatically, however. The club embarked on a sequence of only 2 defeats in 17 league and cup matches, including wins over Manchester City, Chelsea and Tottenham. Everton also found themselves in an all-Merseyside FA Cup Semi-final to play Tottenham or Chelsea in the final at Wembley. After taking the lead through a Jelavić goal, Everton were pegged back in the second half and conceded a late winner to end their cup run for the season. This reverse not withstanding, it was Jelavić's goals (9 in 13 appearances since his signing) that helped secure only 4 defeats in the last 24 league games, and a 7th-place finish, ahead of Liverpool for the first time in 8 seasons.

Everton started the 2012–13 season strongly, losing only one of their first 11 league games by the middle of November, and if the previous seasons games were taken into account, they had lost only 3 of the previous 29 league games since January. A hotly contested derby match at Goodison ended in a 2–2 draw, with Everton fighting back from two goals down. By the start of the new year, Everton had consolidated their position as genuine Champions League place contenders sitting in 5th position, having lost only 3 of the first 24 league matches of the season. Form stumbled somewhat post-Christmas winning only 1 of 6 league games between January and February, hampering their Champions League objectives. The club reached the quarter-finals of the FA Cup and appeared to be well positioned for a third semi-final in the past five seasons, but they were surprised by eventual winners Wigan Athletic at home. League form improved after this defeat, however, and a run of 3 successive victories, including a home win against champions Manchester City, maintained the club's challenge for European qualification.

However, extremely strong finishes by both Tottenham and Arsenal meant that Everton were forced out of the European places and had to settle for 6th, the consolation being finishing above Liverpool for the second season in succession since the 1936–37 season.

The week following the Merseyside derby saw David Moyes announce he was leaving the club at the end of his contract to take up the position of manager of Manchester United after Sir Alex Ferguson's retirement.

Moyes' legacy was a strong core of players, who overachieved slightly within the confines of the financial structures in place at Everton. He took over at a difficult time for the club, who had flirted with relegation for several of the previous seasons prior to his arrival. However, the stability brought was balanced by a lack of genuine success, with a poor away record against the big 4 Premier League sides, a mediocre record when competing in European competitions and no trophies in any of the 11 seasons he was in charge.

== Roberto Martínez era (2013–2016) ==
Wigan Athletic manager Roberto Martínez was named as manager on a four-year deal in June 2013 after a search that took the club several weeks to resolve.

Martínez made 7 acquisitions prior to the end of the transfer window, including 4 of his ex-Wigan players—Arouna Koné, Joel Robles, Antolín Alcaraz and James McCarthy. He was also able to engineer something of a coup by persuading Barcelona and Chelsea to allow highly rated youngsters Gerard Deulofeu and Romelu Lukaku, respectively, to join the club on season-long loans.

Everton began the season well, with only one defeat in the opening 18 games, fewest in all four English divisions, and a record bettered only by Bayern Munich and Roma across Europe's top leagues. On 4 December 2013, Everton beat champions Manchester United, now managed by David Moyes, 1–0 at Old Trafford, their first win at the Manchester club's ground since 1992.

By Christmas, the club was in 5th place in the Premier League. They were 2 points behind the first placed team. At that time, several teams had a similar number of points which made it a close competition for the title.

The club managed to make the quarter-finals of the FA Cup where they were beaten by Arsenal at the Emirates Stadium. March and April brought 7 consecutive wins to cement their fifth-place position, with realistic hopes of occupying a Champions League spot at the end of the season. However, a surprising loss at home to Crystal Palace threatened to derail the challenge as the club entered the final four games of the season. Everton then defeated Manchester United 2–0 at Goodison Park to complete their first double over United since the 1969–70 season, a match that proved to be former manager David Moyes's last game in charge of the Manchester club as he was sacked two days later.

Any hope of gaining Champions League football ended with consecutive defeats to Southampton and eventual champions Manchester City. The club did, however, qualify for the following seasons Europa League competition, finishing in 5th with 72 points, 7 adrift of 4th-placed Arsenal and their highest amount, since the Premier League's inception.

In July, the club broke their transfer record by signing Romelu Lukaku on a permanent transfer for £28 million. Bosnian midfielder Muhamed Bešić was brought in for £4 million from Hungarian club Ferencváros. In a strange deal, Belgian under-18 striker David Henen was brought in on loan from Olympiacos, while the further signings of Christian Atsu (on loan from Chelsea) and Samuel Eto'o (on a free transfer) followed prior to the close of the transfer window.

Everton were off to a slow start in 2014–15, winning only one of their first 7 league matches and conceding 16 goals in that span. As the season dragged on, Everton failed to win its 6 consecutive game around New Year's Day and were sitting only a few points above relegation.

However, they performed strongly in the Europa League, winning their group in 5 matches. This included 4–1 and 2–0 wins over eventual German Bundesliga runners-up Wolfsburg. Everton drew Swiss club Young Boys in the Round of 16 and defeated them 7–2 on aggregate, with Lukaku netting 5 goals. In the next round, Everton won 2–1 at home against Dynamo Kyiv, but were eliminated with a 5–2 defeat in the return leg in Kyiv. Lukaku's 8 goals in 9 Europa League matches would still give him the competition's Golden Boot.

Back in the league, Everton won 6 of their last 10 matches, including a 3–0 win over Manchester United at Goodison Park, to push for 11th place at the end of the season on 47 points, 25 less than the previous season. The winter loan signing of Aaron Lennon from Tottenham helped the cause, while Eto'o left on a free for Sampdoria. This concluded a largely poor league performance, in which Lukaku led the team with 10 goals.

Domestic cups also brought little success; the club won no cup matches. In the League Cup, Everton lost 3–0 to Swansea City in the third round, while in the FA Cup, Everton lost on penalties to West Ham United, also in the third round.

Despite the poor performance, Roberto Martínez stayed for the 2015–16 season. During the summer, Gerard Deulofeu was brought back in on a permanent deal for £6 million, while midfielder Tom Cleverley was brought in on a free transfer from Manchester United. Two South Americans joined the squad as well – Argentinian centre back Ramiro Funes Mori was purchased from River Plate for £9.5 million and Uruguayan striker Leandro Rodríguez was purchased for £500,000 from River Plate Montevideo. Aaron Lennon was also signed on a permanent deal from Spurs for a fee of £4.5 million.

Results still proved to be inconsistent however, with the New Year seeing Everton firmly ensconced in mid-table, although the Capital One Cup provided some solace, as the club reached the semi-finals where they would meet Manchester City; unfortunately, they would fall here. In the January window, Everton purchased striker Oumar Niasse from Lokomotiv Moscow for £13.5 million.

On 27 February, the club officially confirmed the arrival of a new 49.9% shareholder in Farhad Moshiri, an Iranian billionaire who had previously owned a stake in Arsenal.

On 12 May 2016, Martinez was sacked by the club in the face of vocal fan protests against his management in the wake of defeats to rivals Liverpool at Anfield and in the semi-final of the FA Cup to Manchester United. The club ended the season in 11th position, for the second season running.

== Ronald Koeman, Sam Allardyce (2016–2018) ==
In June 2016, Dutchman Ronald Koeman was appointed as manager under a three-year contract. Everton spent the whole of 2016–17 in the top half of the league table. By Boxing Day they were 7th, and remained in the same position for the entirety of the remaining season, qualifying for the Europa League. With 25 goals, Romelu Lukaku became the first Everton player to reach 20 league goals in a season since Gary Lineker in 1985–86, and was the second highest goal scorer in the league.

Before 2017–18, the club broke its own record for transfer fee received, as Lukaku was sold to Manchester United for £90m, and fee paid, spending £45m on Swansea City's Gylfi Sigurðsson. The club spent a total of around £150m on player acquisitions at this time, including £25m on Jordan Pickford, a British record for a goalkeeper. Wayne Rooney also returned to the club, on a free transfer. The team started the season by winning their Europa League qualifying round games, reaching the group stage. Their form thereafter deteriorated rapidly and a 5–2 defeat to Arsenal in October left the club in the relegation zone, almost certainly eliminated from the Europa League and Koeman was sacked the following day. Under-23 coach David Unsworth took temporary charge of the first team, but was unable to prevent them from getting knocked out of the Europa League or the League Cup and also suffered a humiliating 4–1 defeat against Southampton. After over a month in charge, Unsworth was replaced on a permanent basis by Sam Allardyce. Results stabilised under Allardyce, to the extent that the club was able to move away from the relegation zone and finish 8th. He was also able to gain draws in both home and away league fixtures against Liverpool, yet fans never warmed to his safety-first style of football and he was removed as club manager at the end of the season.

== Marco Silva, Carlo Ancelotti (2018–2021) ==
Marco Silva, owner Farhad Moshiri's first choice once Koeman was sacked, before he turned to Sam Allardyce, was unveiled as Everton manager on 31 May. He had been out of work since being sacked by Watford midway through the previous season. Silva guided Everton to an 8th-place finish in his first season as manager. During this time Everton also appointed Marcel Brands as Director of Football, notably signing Richarlison from Watford for £35 million. However, Silva was sacked on 5 December 2019 after a run of poor results, culminating in a 5–2 loss at Anfield in the 234th Merseyside Derby, leaving the club in the relegation zone. Duncan Ferguson was given an interim role as manager. On the 21st of the same month, former Napoli and Real Madrid manager Carlo Ancelotti was appointed permanent manager on a 4-year contract. When he arrived, the club was sitting in 15th place. He eventually led the club to a 12th-place finish in the 2019–20 season. In the 2020–21 season, Everton finished 10th. Until the 6th game of the season, the club held the top spot in the league, following 4 consecutive wins and 1 draw, which could be credited to new signings James Rodríguez, Allan, and Abdoulaye Doucouré. At the winter break, the club was in 2nd place. However, Everton's form started to slip, and the club went through a 5-game winless run in March and April, which eventually left them out of European places. At the end of the season, Ancelotti left the club and returned to Real Madrid. The news came as a shock to many supporters, as the Italian had previously stated that he wanted to stay at the club until the Bramley-Moore Dock stadium opened. Although results during the season were mixed, two notable highlights were winning the Merseyside derby at Anfield 2–0 and winning 1–0 at Emirates Stadium against Arsenal. This was the first time Everton had won at Emirates Stadium in 25 years and at Anfield in 22 years. Their last away win against Arsenal had come in January 1996 while their last away win against Liverpool had come in September 1999; this was also the club's first Merseyside derby win since 2010. Everton also completed their first league double over Arsenal since the 1985–86 season.

== Rafael Benitez, Frank Lampard, Sean Dyche, Return of David Moyes (2021–present) ==
Rafael Benitez was hired in June 2021, becoming the second manager to manage both Merseyside clubs. A strong first two months in charge had the club in 4th place by early October, but Everton slipped down the table and were hovering just outside the relegation places by the new year. Benitez was sacked after a 2–1 loss at Carrow Road against Norwich on 15 January. Duncan Ferguson was in charge for one game as interim manager, before Frank Lampard was hired on 31 January. Everton were involved in a 4-team relegation fight for the remainder of the season and despite dipping into 18th place following an April loss at Burnley, 1–0 wins over Manchester United and Chelsea narrowly kept them above the relegation places. On 19 May, a late winner from Dominic Calvert-Lewin at home against Crystal Palace ensured a 3–2 win and survival.

A run of 8 losses in 9 games around the World Cup break the following season was enough for Moshiri and the board to sack Lampard on 23 January and former Burnley manager Sean Dyche took over a week later. He would eventually guide them to safety, surviving a relegation fight against Leicester and Leeds with a narrow 1–0 home win over Bournemouth on the final day, courtesy of a lone goal from Abdoulaye Doucouré, only 2 points above Leicester.

When Everton were given a 10 point deduction in November of the same year (which was later reduced to 8) Dyche grabbed 4 consecutive wins to bring Everton out of the relegation zone, which included consecutive home wins over Newcastle and Chelsea. A strong run of form towards the end of the season, which included Everton's first home victory against rivals Liverpool at Goodison Park since October 2010 ensured survival. Everton finished the season in 15th place.

After Everton only won 3 league games during the first half the following season, Dyche was sacked on 9 January 2025 with the club only one point above the relegation zone. Leighton Baines and team captain Séamus Coleman were in charge for one game, a 2–0 FA Cup third round home win over Peterborough United before David Moyes returned as manager 2 days later on 11 January 2025, signing a 2 and a half-year contract.

== Club Honours ==
English Football Champions (9): 1890–91, 1914–15, 1927–28, 1931–32, 1938–39, 1962–63, 1969–70, 1984–85, 1986–87. Runners-up (7): 1889–90, 1894–95, 1901–02, 1904–05, 1908–09, 1911–12, 1985–86.

Football League Second Division Champions (1): 1930–31. Runners-up (1): 1953–54.

FA Cup Winners (5): 1905–06, 1932–33, 1965–66, 1983–84, 1994–95. Runners-up (8): 1892–93, 1896–97, 1906–07, 1967–68, 1984–85, 1985–86, 1988–89, 2008–09.

Charity Shield Winners (9): 1928, 1932, 1963, 1970, 1984, 1985, 1986, (shared), 1987, 1995. Runners-up (2): 1933, 1966.

League Cup Runners-up (2): 1976–77, 1983–84.

UEFA Cup Winners' Cup Winners (1): 1984–85.

FA Youth Cup Winners (3): 1964–65, 1983–84, 1997–98. Runners-up (4): 1960–61, 1976–77, 1982–83, 2001–02
