= T. V. Williams =

Chairman of Liverpool

- Occupation: Chairman of Liverpool

Thomas Valentine "T. V." Williams (14 February 1890—1976) was the Chairman of Liverpool F.C. from 1956 to 1964. He subsequently served as the first Life President of the club from 1964 to 1976. Williams had been a shareholder in Liverpool since 1918 and a director of the club since 1948. Williams was a cotton broker in his business career but retired with the closure of the Liverpool Cotton Exchange. Williams devoted his time to Liverpool F.C. after the Second World War rather than return to business.

Williams had first visited Anfield aged five with his father. Williams served on the FA Council and the FA International Committee. William's father and two of his uncles had been members of St. Domingo FC, which was subsequently renamed Everton, and his relatives joined Liverpool as a result of the split from Everton in 1892. Williams held 1000 shares in Liverpool F.C. and as the largest shareholder had considerable power over the appointment of directors.

Williams approached Bill Shankly, the manager of Huddersfield Town, to ask him if he would be like to manage the "best club in the country" to which he jocularly replied "Why, is Matt Busby packing up?" in reference to the Manchester United coach.

Williams also appointed Bob Paisley as the trainer of Liverpool Reserves in 1954.

Williams was a regular player of bridge with John Moores, the chairman of Everton F.C. Williams and Moores also played golf together at Formby Golf Club. Williams also served as the president of West Derby golf club

His funeral was held at Anfield Crematorium.
