= 1984 FA Charity Shield =

- Match programme cover
Everton	Liverpool
1	0
- Date: 18 August 1984
- Venue: Wembley Stadium, London
- Referee: Keith Hackett (South Yorkshire)
- Attendance: 100,000

The 1984 FA Charity Shield (also known as the FA Charity Shield sponsored by General Motors for sponsorship reasons) was the 62nd Charity Shield, a football match contested by the holders of the Football League First Division and FA Cup. This edition featured a Merseyside derby between Liverpool and Everton at Wembley Stadium. Liverpool won the League and Everton won the FA Cup. The match was held on 18 August 1984 and was won 1–0 by Everton after an own goal from Bruce Grobbelaar. Graeme Sharp was straight in on goal and tried to round Grobbelaar, but the ball was blocked on the line by Alan Hansen and ricocheted straight at the shins of Grobbelaar and back into the net.

== Match details ==
18 August 1984
15:00

Everton	1–0	Liverpool
Grobbelaar 55' (o.g.)	Report

Wembley Stadium, London
Attendance: 100,000
Referee: Keith Hackett (South Yorkshire)

Everton	Liverpool

GK	1	(Wales) Neville Southall
DF	2	(England) Gary Stevens
DF	3	(England) John Bailey
DF	4	(Wales) Kevin Ratcliffe (c)
DF	5	(England) Derek Mountfield
MF	6	(England) Peter Reid
MF	7	(England) Trevor Steven
FW	8	(England) Adrian Heath
FW	9	(Scotland) Graeme Sharp
MF	10	(England) Paul Bracewell
MF	11	(England) Kevin Richardson
Substitutes:
GK		(England) Jim Arnold
FW		(Scotland) Andy Gray
DF		(England) Alan Harper
MF		(Republic of Ireland) Kevin Sheedy
FW		(England) Ian Marshall
Manager:
(England) Howard Kendall

GK	1	(Zimbabwe) Bruce Grobbelaar
DF	2	(England) Phil Neal (c)
DF	3	(England) Alan Kennedy
DF	4	(Republic of Ireland) Mark Lawrenson
MF	5	(Republic of Ireland) Ronnie Whelan
DF	6	(Scotland) Alan Hansen
FW	7	(Scotland) Kenny Dalglish
MF	8	(England) Sammy Lee	(substituted off) 53'
FW	9	(Wales) Ian Rush
MF	10	(Scotland) Steve Nicol
MF	11	(Scotland) John Wark
Substitutes:
GK		(England) Bob Bolder
FW		(England) Paul Walsh	(substituted on) 53'
DF		(Scotland) Gary Gillespie
FW		(Republic of Ireland) Michael Robinson
FW		(England) David Hodgson
Manager:
(England) Joe Fagan

== See also ==
- 1983–84 Football League
- 1983–84 FA Cup
