= 1994–95 Everton F.C. season =

English football club season

Everton F.C.
1994–95 season
- Chairman: Peter Johnson
- Manager: Mike Walker (until 8 November 1994); Joe Royle (from 10 November 1994)
- Stadium: Goodison Park
- FA Premier League: 15th
- FA Cup: Winners
- League Cup: Second Round
- Top goalscorer: League: Paul Rideout (14); All: Paul Rideout (16)
- Highest home attendance: 40,011 vs Manchester United (25 Feb 1995, Premier League)
- Lowest home attendance: 14,043 vs Portsmouth (20 Sep 1994, League Cup)
- Average home league attendance: 30,154
Home colours	Away colours

During the 1994–95 English football season, Everton F.C. competed in the FA Premier League.

== Season summary ==
After the previous season's "houdini" escape act which preserved Everton's top flight status, manager Mike Walker was expected to take the club forward and challenge for honours. But a failure to win any of their first twelve Premier League games saw the board run out of patience with Walker and terminated his contract after less than a year at the helm. Former player Joe Royle was named as Walker's successor, and quickly set about reshaping a squad of broken men.

Royle's impact was instantaneous, taking nine points from his first three games, with the standout result being a 2–0 win over rivals Liverpool in the Merseyside derby in his first match as manager. From Royle's appointment to the close of the season the club were firmly in the top six of the form guide, beating champions Manchester United at home and winning away at Chelsea amongst other highlights, leading to Shoot! magazine to dub the transformation 'The Royle Revolution'. League survival was not guaranteed until May however due to the club's poor start, and was secured following a 1–0 win away at already relegated Ipswich Town in the penultimate game of the season. Royle began a sequence when Everton went four-and-a-half calendar years unbeaten in Merseyside derbies, and masterminded a memorable 4–1 demolition of Tottenham Hotspur in the 1995 FA Cup Semi-Final.

Everton finished 15th, but the biggest news of May was victory in the FA Cup Final. The opposition were Premier League runners-up Manchester United, who were most pundits' favourites to win, despite the fact that Everton had previously beaten United in the league that season. A goal from Everton's Paul Rideout, and a succession of thrilling saves by goalkeeper Neville Southall, gave Everton their first major trophy for eight years and their first European campaign of the post-Heysel era.

Royle's arrival at Everton also saw the permanent signature of powerful Scottish striker Duncan Ferguson, and Earl Barrett soon following. Leaving the club were a number of Mike Walker signings including: flop striker Brett Angell, reserve defender Gary Rowett and left-back David Burrows who had only arrived at the club earlier in the season. Long-serving defender/midfielder Ian Snodin who was part of the 1986–87 title-winning side also left the club. Neville Southall and Dave Watson remained from that side.

Everton fans were given more hope of sustained success after the season was over, when it was announced that the club had agreed to sign Russian winger Andrei Kanchelskis from Manchester United for a then-club record fee of £5 million.

== Kit ==
Everton's kit was manufactured by Umbro and sponsored by NEC.

== Final league table ==
Pos	Team	Pld	W	D	L	GF	GA	GD	Pts	Qualification or relegation
13	Sheffield Wednesday	42	13	12	17	49	57	−8	51	Qualification for the Intertoto Cup group stage
14	West Ham United	42	13	11	18	44	48	−4	50	
15	Everton	42	11	17	14	44	51	−7	50	Qualification for the Cup Winners' Cup first round (Note: Everton qualified for the Cup Winners' Cup as FA Cup winners.)
16	Coventry City	42	12	14	16	44	62	−18	50	
17	Manchester City	42	12	13	17	53	64	−11	49	

Source: Premier League
Rules for classification: 1) points; 2) goal difference; 3) number of goals scored.
Notes:

Results summary

Overall								Home						Away					
Pld	W	D	L	GF	GA	GD	Pts	W	D	L	GF	GA	GD	W	D	L	GF	GA	GD
42	11	17	14	44	51	−7	50	8	9	4	31	23	+8	3	8	10	13	28	−15

Source: Statto

Results by round

Round	1	2	3	4	5	6	7	8	9	10	11	12	13	14	15	16	17	18	19	20	21	22	23	24	25	26	27	28	29	30	31	32	33	34	35	36	37	38	39	40	41	42
Ground	H	A	A	H	A	H	H	A	A	H	A	H	H	A	H	A	H	A	H	H	H	A	A	H	A	A	H	A	A	H	A	A	H	A	H	H	A	H	H	H	A	A
Result	D	L	L	L	L	D	D	L	L	L	L	D	W	D	W	W	W	D	D	L	W	L	D	W	D	L	W	D	L	W	D	L	D	W	L	W	D	D	D	D	W	D
Position	7	15	20	20	22	22	22	22	22	22	22	22	22	22	20	19	18	18	19	19	19	20	20	18	16	18	18	17	18	16	17	17	17	17	17	17	17	16	17	17	13	15

Source: Statto.com
A = Away; H = Home; W = Win; D = Draw; L = Loss

== Results ==
Everton's score comes first

=== Legend ===
Win	Draw	Loss

=== FA Premier League ===
Date	Opponent	Venue	Result	Attendance	Scorers
20 August 1994	Aston Villa	H	2–2	35,544	Stuart, Rideout
24 August 1994	Tottenham Hotspur	A	1–2	24,553	Rideout
27 August 1994	Manchester City	A	0–4	19,867	
30 August 1994	Nottingham Forest	H	1–2	26,689	Rideout
10 September 1994	Blackburn Rovers	A	0–3	26,538	
17 September 1994	Queens Park Rangers	H	2–2	27,285	Amokachi, Rideout
24 September 1994	Leicester City	H	1–1	28,003	Ablett
1 October 1994	Manchester United	A	0–2	43,803	
8 October 1994	Southampton	A	0–2	15,163	
15 October 1994	Coventry City	H	0–2	28,233	
22 October 1994	Crystal Palace	A	0–1	14,505	
29 October 1994	Arsenal	H	1–1	32,003	Unsworth
1 November 1994	West Ham United	H	1–0	28,338	Ablett
5 November 1994	Norwich City	A	0–0	18,377	
21 November 1994	Liverpool	H	2–0	39,866	Ferguson, Rideout
26 November 1994	Chelsea	A	1–0	28,115	Rideout
5 December 1994	Leeds United	H	3–0	25,897	Rideout, Ferguson, Unsworth (pen)
10 December 1994	Aston Villa	A	0–0	29,678	
17 December 1994	Tottenham Hotspur	H	0–0	32,809	
26 December 1994	Sheffield Wednesday	H	1–4	37,089	Ferguson
31 December 1994	Ipswich Town	H	4–1	25,659	Ferguson, Rideout (2), Watson
2 January 1995	Wimbledon	A	1–2	9,506	Rideout
14 January 1995	Arsenal	A	1–1	34,743	Watson
21 January 1995	Crystal Palace	H	3–1	23,733	Ferguson (2), Rideout
24 January 1995	Liverpool	A	0–0	39,505	
1 February 1995	Newcastle United	A	0–2	34,465	
4 February 1995	Norwich City	H	2–1	23,293	Stuart, Rideout
13 February 1995	West Ham United	A	2–2	21,081	Rideout, Limpar
22 February 1995	Leeds United	A	0–1	30,793	
25 February 1995	Manchester United	H	1–0	40,011	Ferguson
4 March 1995	Leicester City	A	2–2	20,447	Limpar, Samways
8 March 1995	Nottingham Forest	A	1–2	24,526	Barlow
15 March 1995	Manchester City	H	1–1	28,485	Unsworth (pen)
18 March 1995	Queens Park Rangers	A	3–2	14,488	Barlow, McDonald (own goal), Hinchcliffe
1 April 1995	Blackburn Rovers	H	1–2	37,905	Stuart
14 April 1995	Newcastle United	H	2–0	34,811	Amokachi (2)
17 April 1995	Sheffield Wednesday	A	0–0	27,880	
29 April 1995	Wimbledon	H	0–0	33,063	
3 May 1995	Chelsea	H	3–3	33,180	Hinchcliffe, Ablett, Amokachi
6 May 1995	Southampton	H	0–0	36,840	
9 May 1995	Ipswich Town	A	1–0	14,951	Rideout
14 May 1995	Coventry City	A	0–0	21,814	

=== FA Cup ===
Round	Date	Opponent	Venue	Result	Attendance	Goalscorers
R3	7 January 1995	Derby County	H	1–0	29,406	Hinchcliffe
R4	29 January 1995	Bristol City	A	1–0	19,816	Jackson
R5	18 February 1995	Norwich City	H	5–0	31,616	Limpar, Parkinson, Rideout, Ferguson, Stuart
QF	12 March 1995	Newcastle United	H	1–0	35,203	Watson
SF	9 April 1995	Tottenham Hotspur	N	4–1	38,226	Jackson, Stuart, Amokachi (2)
F	20 May 1995	Manchester United	N	1–0	79,592	Rideout

=== League Cup ===
Round	Date	Opponent	Venue	Result	Attendance	Goalscorers
R2 1st Leg	20 September 1994	Portsmouth	H	2–3	14,043	Samways, Stuart (pen)
R2 2nd Leg	5 October 1994	Portsmouth	A	1–1 (lost 3–4 on agg)	13,605	Watson

== Squad ==
Note: Flags indicate national team as defined under FIFA eligibility rules; some limited exceptions apply. Players may hold more than one non-FIFA nationality.

No.	Pos.	Nation	Player
1	GK	WAL	Neville Southall
2	DF	ENG	Matt Jackson
3	DF	ENG	Andy Hinchcliffe
4	DF	ENG	Earl Barrett
5	DF	ENG	Dave Watson (captain)
6	DF	ENG	Gary Ablett
7	MF	ENG	Vinny Samways
8	MF	ENG	Graham Stuart
9	FW	SCO	Duncan Ferguson
10	MF	WAL	Barry Horne
11	FW	NGA	Daniel Amokachi
12	DF	ENG	Paul Holmes
13	GK	AUS	Jason Kearton
14	MF	ENG	John Ebbrell
15	FW	ENG	Paul Rideout

No.	Pos.	Nation	Player
17	MF	SWE	Anders Limpar
18	MF	ENG	Joe Parkinson
19	FW	ENG	Stuart Barlow
21	DF	ENG	Gary Rowett
23	DF	ENG	Alex Smith
25	DF	ENG	Neil Moore
26	DF	ENG	David Unsworth
27	DF	ENG	Mark Grugel
28	MF	ENG	Chris Price
29	MF	ENG	Tony Grant
30	FW	ENG	Dan Leeming
31	GK	ENG	Steve Reeves
33	GK	ENG	Jamie Speare

=== Left club during season ===
Note: Flags indicate national team as defined under FIFA eligibility rules; some limited exceptions apply. Players may hold more than one non-FIFA nationality.

No.	Pos.	Nation	Player
4	MF	ENG	Ian Snodin (to Oldham Athletic)
9	FW	ENG	Tony Cottee (to West Ham United)
16	DF	ENG	David Burrows (to Coventry City)

No.	Pos.	Nation	Player
20	MF	SCO	Ian Durrant (on loan from Rangers)
22	FW	ENG	Brett Angell (to Sunderland)
23	MF	ENG	John Doolan (to Mansfield Town)
24	MF	ENG	Chris Priest (to Chester City)

=== Reserve squad ===
Note: Flags indicate national team as defined under FIFA eligibility rules; some limited exceptions apply. Players may hold more than one non-FIFA nationality.

No. / Pos. / Nation / Player; — / DF / ENG / Graham Allen	No. / Pos. / Nation / Player; — / DF / ENG / Jon O'Connor

== Transfers ==
=== In ===
Date	Pos	Name	From	Fee
2 August 1994	MF	Vinny Samways	Tottenham Hotspur	£2,200,000
27 August 1994	FW	Daniel Amokachi	Club Brugge	£3,000,000
6 September 1994	DF	David Burrows	West Ham United	Transfer
11 December 1994	FW	Duncan Ferguson	Rangers	£4,000,000
30 January 1995	DF	Earl Barrett	Aston Villa	£1,700,000

=== Out ===
Date	Pos	Name	To	Fee
22 July 1994	FW	Paul Tait	Wigan Athletic	Free transfer
2 September 1994	MF	John Doolan	Mansfield Town	Free transfer
7 September 1994	FW	Tony Cottee	West Ham United	Transfer
9 January 1995	MF	Ian Snodin	Oldham Athletic	Free transfer
2 March 1995	DF	David Burrows	Coventry City	£1,100,000
23 March 1995	FW	Brett Angell	Sunderland	£600,000

Transfers in: ▼£10,900,000
Transfers out: ▲£1,700,000
Total spending: ▼£9,200,000
