= 1984 Football League Cup final =

- Event: 1983–84 Football League Cup
Liverpool	Everton
- Liverpool won after a replay
Liverpool	Everton
0	0
- After extra time
- Date: 25 March 1984
- Venue: Wembley Stadium, London
- Referee: Alan Robinson
- Attendance: 100,000

Replay
Liverpool	Everton
1	0
- Date: 28 March 1984
- Venue: Maine Road, Manchester
- Referee: Alan Robinson
- Attendance: 52,089

The 1984 Football League Cup final (billed as the Milk Cup Final) was an association football match between Liverpool and Everton. The initial final was a dour affair in which Liverpool had more chances but Everton saw what seemed a clear-cut penalty claim waved away by the referee when Alan Hansen used his hand to steer Adrian Heath's goal-bound shot off the Liverpool goal line. The replay was equally dour but Liverpool won the game through a first-half Graeme Souness goal at Maine Road. This was Liverpool's fourth consecutive success in the competition and also the third consecutive final in which they had defeated that season's eventual FA Cup winners.

== Match details ==
25 March 1984
14:30

Liverpool	0–0 (a.e.t.)	Everton
	Report

Wembley Stadium, London
Attendance: 100,000
Referee: Alan Robinson

Liverpool	Everton

GK	1	(Zimbabwe) Bruce Grobbelaar
RB	2	(England) Phil Neal
LB	3	(England) Alan Kennedy
CB	4	(Republic of Ireland) Mark Lawrenson
LM	5	(Republic of Ireland) Ronnie Whelan
CB	6	(Scotland) Alan Hansen
CF	7	(Scotland) Kenny Dalglish
RM	8	(England) Sammy Lee
CF	9	(Wales) Ian Rush
CM	10	(Australia) Craig Johnston	(substituted off) 91'
CM	11	(Scotland) Graeme Souness (c)
Substitute:
FW	12	(Republic of Ireland) Michael Robinson	(substituted on) 91'
Manager:
(England) Joe Fagan

GK	1	(Wales) Neville Southall
RB	2	(England) Gary Stevens
LB	3	(England) John Bailey
CB	4	(Wales) Kevin Ratcliffe (c)
CB	5	(England) Derek Mountfield
CM	6	(England) Peter Reid
RM	7	(Scotland) Alan Irvine
CF	8	(England) Adrian Heath
CF	9	(Scotland) Graeme Sharp
CM	10	(England) Kevin Richardson
LM	11	(Republic of Ireland) Kevin Sheedy (substituted off) 75'
Substitute:
DF/MF	12	(England) Alan Harper (substituted on) 75'
Manager:
(England) Howard Kendall

Match rules

- 90 minutes.
- 30 minutes of extra-time if necessary.
- Replay if scores still level.
- One named substitute.
- Maximum of one substitution.

== Replay ==
28 March 1984
19:30

Liverpool	1–0	Everton
Souness 21'	Report

Maine Road, Manchester
Attendance: 52,089
Referee: Alan Robinson

Liverpool	Everton

GK	1	(Zimbabwe) Bruce Grobbelaar
RB	2	(England) Phil Neal
LB	3	(England) Alan Kennedy
CB	4	(Republic of Ireland) Mark Lawrenson
LM	5	(Republic of Ireland) Ronnie Whelan
CB	6	(Scotland) Alan Hansen
CF	7	(Scotland) Kenny Dalglish
RM	8	(England) Sammy Lee
CF	9	(Wales) Ian Rush
CM	10	(Australia) Craig Johnston
CM	11	(Scotland) Graeme Souness (c)
Substitute:
FW	12	(Republic of Ireland) Michael Robinson
Manager:
(England) Joe Fagan

GK	1	(Wales) Neville Southall
RB	2	(England) Gary Stevens
LB	3	(England) John Bailey
CB	4	(Wales) Kevin Ratcliffe (c)
CB	5	(England) Derek Mountfield
CM	6	(England) Peter Reid
RM	7	(Scotland) Alan Irvine (substituted off)
CF	8	(England) Adrian Heath
CF	9	(Scotland) Graeme Sharp
MF	10	(England) Kevin Richardson
MF	11	(England) Alan Harper
Substitute:
MF	12	(England) Andy King (substituted on)
Manager:
(England) Howard Kendall

Match rules

- 90 minutes.
- 30 minutes of extra-time if necessary.
- One named substitute.
- Maximum of one substitution.
