= Kevin Ratcliffe =

Welsh footballer and manager

Personal information
- Full name: Kevin Ratcliffe
- Date of birth: 12 November 1960 (age 65)
- Place of birth: Mancot, Wales
- Height: 5 ft 11 in (1.80 m)
- Positions: Central defender; left back

Youth career
- Everton

Senior career*
Years	Team	Apps	(Gls)
1980–1992	Everton	359	(2)
1992	Dundee	4	(0)
1992–1993	Cardiff City	25	(1)
1993	Nottingham Forest	0	(0)
1994	Derby County	6	(0)
1994–1995	Chester City	23	(0)
Total		406	(3)

International career
1981–1993	Wales	59	(0)

Managerial career
- 1995–1999: Chester City
- 1999–2003: Shrewsbury Town
- * Club domestic league appearances and goals

Kevin Ratcliffe (born 12 November 1960) is a Welsh former professional footballer who spent most of his career playing for Everton.

== Club career ==
Ratcliffe was born in Mancot, near Queensferry in Flintshire, Wales. He joined Everton as an apprentice in 1977 and made his debut on 12 March 1980 at Old Trafford, Manchester after replacing John Gidman through injury, but was not a first team regular until 1982. He was initially used as a left back with mixed results, but his form improved dramatically when moved to centre back. Around this time Ipswich Town manager Bobby Robson was interested in Ratcliffe, as were Blackburn Rovers and Stoke City In 1983 at the age of 23 he was made captain, just as the club began a highly successful spell. Whilst captain Ratcliffe won the 1984 FA Cup Final, the Football League Championship in 1984–85 and 1986–87 and the UEFA Cup Winners' Cup 1984–85. There were also three other FA Cup finals, 1985, 1986 and 1989, and a League Cup Final appearance in 1984. Ratcliffe made 461 appearances for Everton and scored two goals in that time (one a 30-yarder at Anfield).

Ratcliffe was renowned for his robust approach to the game and for being a tough tackler. He was sent off early in his career for a head butt in 1981 on Tommy Hutchison against Manchester City. He was also involved in a notable incident with Vinnie Jones in 1989 against Wimbledon. In a bad tempered match, Jones had put in a late tackle against striker Graeme Sharp flooring him, and Ratcliffe steamed forward to challenge Jones aggressively. Jones brushed his head forward in what appeared to be a headbutt, with Ratcliffe going down. Jones later claimed in his autobiography that his head barely touched Ratcliffe's and Ratcliffe had feigned contact to get him sent off, and expressed disappointment at the dishonesty of his fellow "hard man". This was later confirmed in Graeme Sharp's book, Sharpy, My Story when he admitted both him and Ratcliffe exaggerated Jones's contact on them both to get him sent off to their pleasure.

Ratcliffe has said in an interview the hardest (most aggressive) opponents he faced were Graeme Souness, Jimmy Case, Mick Harford and Billy Whitehurst, with Whitehurst supposedly being the hardest of all.

After leaving Everton in 1992, he went to Dundee and then played for a short spells with Cardiff City, Nottingham Forest, Derby County and Chester City.

== International career ==
Ratcliffe was capped 59 times by the Wales national team, often as captain. He also represented his country at under-21, youth and schoolboy level. Despite several near-misses and boasting famous players such as Ian Rush, Neville Southall, Ryan Giggs and Mark Hughes as well as Ratcliffe, Wales failed to qualify for a major tournament while Ratcliffe was involved in the set-up. He was a roommate of Liverpool rival Ian Rush's during matches.

== Managerial career ==
In 1994, Ratcliffe joined Chester City as player-assistant manager to Mike Pejic, and kept the position under succeeding manager Derek Mann. When Mann resigned in April 1995 after relegation was confirmed, Ratcliffe took over as caretaker manager for the final five matches of the season, and was able to earn two wins and a draw; enough to avoid the humiliation of a bottom-place finish, which earned Ratcliffe the manager's job permanently. He stayed at the helm until August 1999, when he left after falling out with new owner Terry Smith. The highlight of his years at Chester City was guiding the club to the Division Three play-offs in 1996–97 and he later took credit for steering the club to a mid-table position in 1998–99 while in serious financial trouble. Reputedly Ratcliffe drew £5,000 from his own bank account to help cover the costs of a water bill because the club's cheques were refused.

In November 1999 Ratcliffe joined Shrewsbury Town as manager and helped them avoid relegation from the Football League on the final day of the 1999–2000 season at Chester City's expense. The highlight of his tenure was a January 2003 FA Cup third round victory over his former club Everton. But a disastrous run after this saw Shrewsbury Town relegated to the Football Conference after 53 years in the Football League. Ratcliffe left the club within days, stating that he had to take the blame for Shrewsbury Town's downfall as he had brought in most of their players.

== Media career ==
Ratcliffe now works for BBC Wales Sport.

== Managerial statistics ==
All competitive league games (league and domestic cup) and international matches (including friendlies) are included.

As of 11 April 2015

Team	Nat	Year	Record				
Team	Nat	Year	G	W	D	L	Win %
Chester City	(England)	1995–1999	212	75	61	76	35.38
Shrewsbury Town	(England)	1999–2003	187	58	45	84	31.02
Career total			399	133	106	160	33.33

== Honours ==
Everton

- Football League First Division: 1984–85, 1986–87
- FA Cup: 1983–84; runner-up: 1984–85, 1985–86, 1988–89
- FA Charity Shield: 1984, 1985, 1986, 1987
- European Cup Winners' Cup: 1984–85
- Football League Cup runner-up: 1983–84
- Full Members' Cup runner-up: 1988–89, 1990–91

Cardiff City

- Football League Third Division: 1992–93

Individual

- PFA Team of the Year: 1984–85 First Division

Sporting positions
Preceded by Mark Higgins	Everton captain 1984-1991	Succeeded by Dave Watson
