= 1989 FA Cup final =

English association football match

- Event: 1988–89 FA Cup
Liverpool	Everton
3	2
- After extra time
- Date: 20 May 1989
- Venue: Wembley Stadium, London
- Man of the Match: Ian Rush
- Referee: Joe Worrall (Cheshire)
- Attendance: 82,800
- Weather: Warm and fine, with hazy sunshine

The 1989 FA Cup final was the final of the 1988–89 FA Cup, the top football knockout competition in England. The match was a Merseyside derby between Liverpool and Everton, played at Wembley Stadium, London, on 20 May 1989. Liverpool won 3–2 after extra time, with a goal from John Aldridge and two from Ian Rush. Stuart McCall scored both Everton goals. The final was played just five weeks after the Hillsborough disaster, in which 95 Liverpool fans were killed in a crush (the death toll rose to 96 in 1993 and 97 in 2021), and before kick-off there was a minute's silence and the teams wore black armbands as a sign of respect. Gerry Marsden, lead singer of Gerry & the Pacemakers, led the crowd in a rendition of his hit "You'll Never Walk Alone", which had become synonymous with Liverpool Football Club.

== Summary ==
Liverpool took the lead in the match after four minutes through John Aldridge, and held onto that lead until the ninetieth minute, when Everton substitute Stuart McCall equalised, and a pitch invasion by Everton fans ensued. McCall had scored just once for Everton before the FA Cup final, having joined them from Bradford City at the start of the season.

McCall's goal was the last kick of the 90 minutes and the match went into extra time. On 95 minutes, Liverpool substitute Ian Rush scored with a half-volley on the turn to give Liverpool a 2–1 lead. Everton again equalised five minutes later when McCall scored his second, chesting and volleying past Bruce Grobbelaar and into the corner of the net, becoming the first substitute to score twice in a final. Rush, who had scored twice in Liverpool's 3–1 win in the first Merseyside derby final three years earlier, scored his second goal in the 104th minute, with a header from a floated John Barnes cross.

Liverpool had continued their domination of the English game (they were league champions in 1988 and runners-up in 1987), but Everton had declined since their 1987 title triumph and finished sixth in the league in 1989.

UEFA voted for the ban on English clubs in European competitions to continue for a fifth season, ruling out Liverpool's hopes of competing in the Cup Winners' Cup, although they were still in contention for the league title at this stage, and ultimately were only deprived of the title (and a unique second double) by a last-gasp goal in their final game of the season.

Liverpool striker Ian Rush had now scored four goals in FA Cup finals (both two-goal hauls against Everton) and was one of 11 players (five for Liverpool) to have featured in both of the all-Merseyside FA Cup finals. Stuart McCall made FA Cup history when he became the first substitute to score two goals in an FA Cup final. Ian Rush matched the feat two minutes later.

== Match details ==
20 May 1989
15:00 BST

Liverpool	3–2 (a.e.t.)	Everton
Aldridge 4'; Rush 95', 104'	Report	McCall 90', 102'

Wembley Stadium, London
Attendance: 82,800
Referee: Joe Worrall (Cheshire)

Liverpool	Everton

GK	1	(Zimbabwe) Bruce Grobbelaar
CB	2	(England) Gary Ablett
LB	3	(Republic of Ireland) Steve Staunton	(substituted off) 90'
RB	4	(Scotland) Steve Nicol
CM	5	(Republic of Ireland) Ronnie Whelan (c)
CB	6	(Scotland) Alan Hansen
CF	7	(England) Peter Beardsley
CF	8	(Republic of Ireland) John Aldridge	(substituted off) 73'
RM	9	(Republic of Ireland) Ray Houghton
LM	10	(England) John Barnes
CM	11	(England) Steve McMahon
Substitutes:
DF	12	(England) Barry Venison	(substituted on) 90'
FW	14	(Wales) Ian Rush	(substituted on) 73'
Manager:
(Scotland) Kenny Dalglish

GK	1	(Wales) Neville Southall
RB	2	(England) Neil McDonald
LB	3	(Wales) Pat Van Den Hauwe
CB	4	(Wales) Kevin Ratcliffe (c)
CB	5	(England) Dave Watson
CM	6	(England) Paul Bracewell	(substituted off) 59'
RM	7	(Scotland) Pat Nevin
CM	8	(England) Trevor Steven
CF	9	(Scotland) Graeme Sharp
CF	10	(England) Tony Cottee
LM	11	(Republic of Ireland) Kevin Sheedy	(substituted off) 78'
Substitutes:
MF	12	(Scotland) Ian Wilson	(substituted on) 78'
MF	14	(Scotland) Stuart McCall	(substituted on) 59'
Manager:
(England) Colin Harvey

Match rules

- 90 minutes
- 30 minutes of extra-time if necessary
- Replay if scores still level
- Two named substitutes
- Maximum of two substitutions
