= Neville Southall =

Welsh footballer (born 1958)

Neville Southall MBE
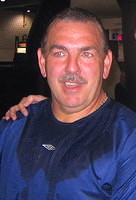
- Southall in 2007

Personal information
- Full name: Neville Southall
- Date of birth: 16 September 1958 (age 68)
- Place of birth: Llandudno, Wales
- Height: 6 ft 1 in (1.85 m)
- Position: Goalkeeper

Youth career
- 1970–1973: Llandudno Swifts

Senior career*
Years	Team	Apps	(Gls)
1970–1973	Llandudno Swifts		
1973–1974	Llandudno Town		
1974–1977	Bangor City	6+	(0)
1976–1979	Conwy United		
1979–1980	Winsford United	3+	(0)
1980–1981	Bury	39	(0)
1981–1998	Everton	578	(0)
1983	→ Port Vale (loan)	9	(0)
1997–1998	→ Southend United (loan)	9	(0)
1998	→ Stoke City (loan)	3	(0)
1998	Stoke City	9	(0)
1998	Doncaster Rovers	9	(0)
1998–2000	Torquay United	53	(0)
1998–1999	Huddersfield Town		
2000	Bradford City	1	(0)
2001	York City		
2001	Rhyl	3	(0)
2001	Shrewsbury Town		
2001	Dover Athletic		
2001–2002	Shrewsbury Town		
2002	Dagenham & Redbridge		
Total		722+	(0)

International career
1982–1997	Wales	92	(0)

Managerial career
- 1999: Wales (caretaker)
- 2001–2002: Dover Athletic
- 2004–2005: Hastings United
- 2009: Margate (caretaker)
- * Club domestic league appearances and goals

Neville Southall MBE (born 16 September 1958) is a Welsh football manager and former international footballer. He has been described as one of the best goalkeepers of his generation. He won the FWA Footballer of the Year award in 1985 and was nominated for the Ballon d'Or in 1985 and 1987. In addition, he is one of the few players to have made over 1,050 career appearances.

He joined Bury from Winsford United for a £6,000 fee in 1980. He turned professional in his early 20s after several years as a semi-professional and amateur player. During his teenage years, he worked as a binman, waiter and hod carrier. He moved on to Everton for £150,000 in 1981 and established himself as the club's first-choice goalkeeper by the 1983–84 season. He went on to make a club record 578 appearances in the English Football League and Premier League (750 in all competitions); his honours with the club consist of a European Cup Winners' Cup medal in 1985, a First Division championship medal in 1984–85 and 1986–87, an FA Cup winners medal in 1984 and 1995, and an FA Charity Shield winners medal in 1984, 1985, and 1995. He also played in the 1985 and 1989 FA Cup finals, the League Cup final in 1984, and helped Everton to a second place in the league in 1985–86. After leaving Everton in 1998, he became Torquay United's regular goalkeeper for two years. He also made a handful of appearances for numerous other clubs.

Southall played internationally for Wales, winning 92 caps between 1982 and 1998, though he did not feature in any major international competitions. As an individual, he was named on the PFA Team of the Year four consecutive times. He was listed as one of the world's top ten goalkeepers by the International Federation of Football History & Statistics on four occasions. He is a member of the Gwladys Street's Hall of Fame. He has been named as one of the 100 'Greatest Players of the 20th Century' by World Soccer magazine. In the 1996 Birthday Honours, he was appointed a Member of the Order of the British Empire (MBE) for his services to football.

Since his retirement as a player, Southall has briefly managed Dover Athletic, Hastings United and Margate, and has coached at numerous clubs as well as the Welsh national youth teams. He has also worked extensively with disadvantaged children and established his own educational consultancy. In addition, Southall is also known for his political activism; he is an international officer for his branch of the UNISON trade union, endorsed Jeremy Corbyn for the 2017 UK general election, endorses LGBT rights, and has spoken at multiple events advocating for Welsh independence.

== Club career ==
=== Early years ===
Born and raised in Llandudno to Fred and Rose Southall, he was the middle child of three boys. Southall played youth football for his school team and the Llandudno Swifts, where he played alongside Joey Jones. He was educated at Ysgol John Bright, though left without any qualifications at age 16. At age 14, he toured Germany with the Llandudno Swifts and was offered a chance to play for the youth team of Bundesliga club Fortuna Düsseldorf, but decided against the move to Germany. The Swifts were a poor side that were regularly beaten heavily, though the near-constant barrage of shots he faced enabled Southall to improve on his shot-stopping skills.

As a teenager, Southall had unsuccessful trials at Wrexham, Crewe Alexandra and Bolton Wanderers. He aspired to be a postman, and never believed that he would make a living playing football. He then worked as a binman, waiter and hod carrier and therefore entered the game relatively late. He played for Llandudno Town at age 15, before joining Northern Premier League side Bangor City on £10 a week as a semi-professional the following year. Bangor manager Dave Elliott regularly selected veteran goalkeeper Peter Eales ahead of Southall. Everton asked Elliot permission to take Southall on trial, but Elliot left the club shortly after and no trial took place. With Bangor in financial trouble the paid playing staff began to leave the club, and Southall left Bangor and went on to accept an offer of £3 a week to play for Conwy United. He moved on to Cheshire County League club Winsford United at the age of 20. The club won the Cheshire Senior Cup in 1980, and Southall was voted the club's Player of the Year.

=== Bury ===
Southall's performances attracted the attention of Bury and Wigan Athletic, and he was convinced to sign with Bury after he was personally approached by manager Dave Connor. Bury paid Winsford £6,000 and would later pay another £25,000 after he was sold on. However, he never played for Connor as he was replaced by Jim Iley before the start of the 1980–81 season; despite this managerial change he was still seen as the future replacement to club stalwart John Forrest. He received specialist goalkeeping coaching from Wilf McGuinness. He made his first-team debut against Wigan Athletic on 20 September, in a 2–1 victory. The "Shakers" had an indifferent league campaign in the Fourth Division, though they managed to reach the third round of the FA Cup and beat Newcastle United in the League Cup. Southall kept 15 clean sheets after conceding 50 goals in his 44 domestic appearances, and was named as Bury's Player of the Year and Young Player of the Year.

=== Everton ===
Southall was bought by Everton manager Howard Kendall for £150,000 in the summer of 1981. To win a first-team place he had to compete with Jim McDonagh (a Gordon Lee signing who would soon leave the club), Jim Arnold (also a new signing), and Martin Hodge (who was injured throughout his time at Everton). He made his debut in a 2–1 win over Ipswich Town in October after Arnold picked up an injury. He returned to the first-team in December, and he kept a clean sheet against Aston Villa and remained an ever-present throughout the rest of the 1981–82 season.

Kendall described Southall as the best goalkeeper in the First Division "outside the big three" of Ray Clemence, Peter Shilton and Joe Corrigan. However, he began to suffer from ulcerated toes, which gave him severely swollen feet and caused him pain and discomfort throughout matches. On 6 November 1982, he conceded five goals in a 5–0 defeat to Mersey rivals Liverpool at Goodison Park. Kendall then dropped Southall as part of a shake-up at the club. He spent January and February on loan at John McGrath's Port Vale, and played nine Fourth Division games. McGrath was impressed and tried to take Southall to Vale Park permanently, but was rebuffed by Kendall. Back at Everton, he played the last four games of the 1982–83 season after Arnold picked up an injury.

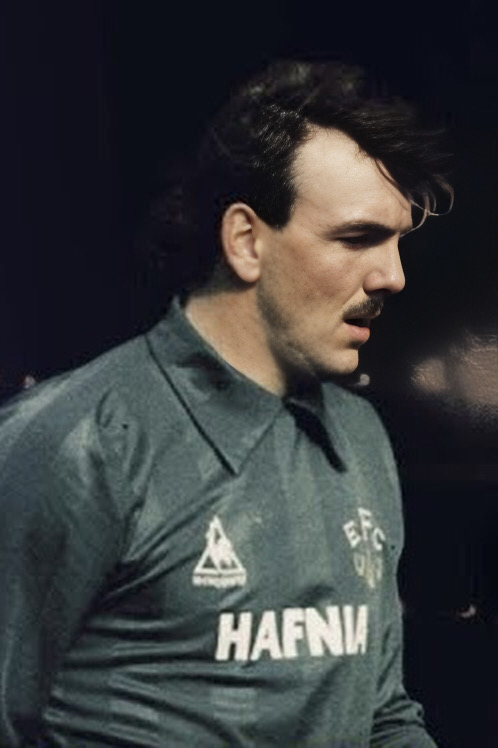
Southall made a record 751 first-team appearances for Everton between 1981 and 1997

Arnold was the preferred choice in goal at the start of the 1983–84 season before Southall was recalled on 1 October against Notts County. Everton had a poor start to the league campaign but excelled in cup competitions, reaching the final of both the League Cup and the FA Cup. Southall's first appearance at Wembley was in the League Cup final against Liverpool, and he kept a clean sheet in a goalless draw. The replay was held at Maine Road, and Liverpool won the tie 1–0 with a Graeme Souness goal. He was rarely called into action in the 1984 FA Cup final and kept a clean sheet as Everton claimed the trophy with a 2–0 victory over Watford.

Southall kept a clean sheet at Wembley in the 1984 FA Charity Shield, as Everton beat Liverpool 1–0 to take home the first silverware of the 1984–85 season. They then lost the opening two league games of the season before losing only three of their next 37 league games to win the First Division title by a 13-point margin. Throughout the season, they beat Liverpool both at Anfield and at Goodison and recorded a 5–0 win over Manchester United. Southall made one particularly crucial save from a point-blank Mark Falco header in a 2–1 win over title chasers Tottenham Hotspur at White Hart Lane on 3 April. In the European Cup Winners' Cup, Everton beat UCD (Ireland), Inter Bratislava (Czechoslovakia), Fortuna Sittard (Netherlands), and Bayern Munich (Germany) in two-legged encounters. Southall conceded just one goal (from Dieter Hoeneß) throughout all eight matches. They then beat Austrian club Rapid Wien 3–1 in the final at De Kuip to win the first European title in the club's history. Three days later, Everton played in the 1985 FA Cup final, but lost 1–0 to Manchester United after a Norman Whiteside goal in extra time. At the end of the season, Southall was named as the FWA Footballer of the Year, becoming the first Everton player, second Welshman and fourth goalkeeper to win the award.

Though Everton had won a place in the European Cup, English clubs were banned from European competitions following the Heysel Stadium disaster. Southall remained bitter, blaming UEFA for the tragedy and stating that the ban was a convenient way to break up English dominance of European competitions. Limited to domestic competitions, Everton won the FA Charity Shield with a 2–0 win over Manchester United; during the celebrations, Southall wore a T-shirt saying "I Love My Wife" as a symbolic gesture following tabloid stories of an alleged affair. After getting sent off against Chelsea at Stamford Bridge in October, Kendall criticised Southall in the press by saying he "let the lads down". Despite this setback, he agreed to sign a six-year contract in December, which was then the longest contract the club had ever issued. However, he twisted his ankle ligaments on international duty with ten league games left to play. In his absence, his deputy Bobby Mimms took his place, and Everton lost both the league title and the 1986 FA Cup final to Liverpool.

Sidelined through injury at the start of the 1986–87 season, he returned to the first-team against Watford in October. He was the club's Player of the Month in February and won man of the match awards in wins over Arsenal and Chelsea as Everton claimed another league title. Comparing the two title wins (1985 and 1987), Southall said that the latter success was "more rewarding and satisfying" as it had proved to be "more of a struggle" compared to the ease in which the title was won in the former campaign.

After Kendall left Merseyside to coach Athletic Bilbao, his assistant Colin Harvey took charge at Goodison; Southall responded well to the change, as he believed Harvey "understood my obsessive and relentless desire to be the best". Everton finished fourth in 1987–88, conceding a club record low of 27 goals in 40 league games, and reached the semi-finals of the League Cup. Southall had missed the opening stages of the season after undergoing knee surgery.

Harvey had failed to replace some of Everton's departing star players adequately, and Southall noted how "the mediocrity became habitual" as the club coasted to an eighth-place finish in the 1988–89 season. He kept goal in the final of the Full Members Cup (a largely unsuccessful tournament inspired by the ban on European football), as Everton were beaten 4–3 by Nottingham Forest. More significantly, he kept goal against Liverpool in the 1989 FA Cup final after conceding only two goals in the seven games en route to the final. In an emotional match in the aftermath of the Hillsborough disaster in the semi-final encounter with Nottingham Forest, Liverpool won the cup with a 3–2 extra-time victory.

Everton were leading the division at the start of the 1989–90 season, but their title challenge fell away after a televised 6–2 defeat to Aston Villa. Southall was later told he needed surgery that would keep him out of action for eight months, but he instead sought out a back specialist who told him he had a "bad back" and found that the problem corrected itself.

Southall requested a transfer before the start of the 1990–91 season. He famously sat down during a "sulking session" against a goalpost at half-time of the season opener whilst his teammates were still in the changing rooms while two goals down to newly-promoted Leeds United (a game Everton eventually lost 3–2); Southall was fined two weeks wages despite denying it was a protest and that he did it to clear his head. He then received a phone call from Manchester United manager Alex Ferguson. Still, Southall's hostile phone manner put Ferguson off the idea of signing him, and Ferguson instead bought Danish goalkeeper Peter Schmeichel. Howard Kendall returned as Everton manager in November, with Colin Harvey being demoted to his assistant, and led the club out of relegation trouble to secure a ninth-place finish. They also reached the final of the Full Members Cup at Wembley, losing 4–1 to Crystal Palace, though Southall refused to collect his runners-up medal as he did not value the competition.

Everton were a declining force and finished 12th in the league in 1991–92 whilst exiting both the FA Cup and League Cup in the fourth round. They then finished 13th in the 1992–93 season in the newly created Premier League, just four points above the relegation zone. Kendall resigned mid-way through the 1993–94 campaign and was replaced by Mike Walker – Southall later described Walker as a man who loved his suntan more than football. Walker oversaw a run of bad results, and Everton only escaped relegation with a final day victory over Wimbledon, winning 3–2 after turning round a 2–0 deficit. Southall saw that his teammates were reluctant to take a penalty in the match and so took the ball himself before Graham Stuart plucked up the courage to take the ball from him and convert the penalty.

Everton picked up four points from their opening 12 league games of the 1994–95 season. Southall received death threats after being confronted by an Everton fan during a match at Goodison Park. Walker was sacked and replaced by Joe Royle, who led the club to a 2–0 win over Liverpool in his first match in charge – this game also marked a record 35th Merseyside derby appearance for Southall. It was also the second match of seven consecutive games Everton went without conceding a goal – another club record. Southall then conceded just one goal (a penalty) in five games en route to the 1995 FA Cup final against Manchester United. Everton won the game 1–0, with Southall making a double save from Paul Scholes; the victory left Southall as the most decorated Everton player in the club's history.

In the summer of 1995, Southall was given a testimonial match against Celtic as well as an MBE – during the ceremony the Queen asked Southall "what will you do now that you're retired?". He went on to keep a clean sheet in the 1995 FA Charity Shield, as Everton beat Blackburn Rovers 1–0. He remained an ever-present in the 1995–96 season, though Royle then tried to sign Crystal Palace goalkeeper Nigel Martyn. He tried to sell Southall to Wolverhampton Wanderers, but cancelled the deal after becoming concerned over the pre-season form of touted replacement Paul Gerrard, and instead doubled Southall's wages to £6,000 a week with a new two-year contract. Despite this, Royle dedicated an entire chapter of his 2005 autobiography to decrying Southall as a "potential weak link".

After a promising start to the 1996–97, Everton were beaten six times after Christmas. Southall resorted to ringing up a phone-in radio show to defend manager Joe Royle from unhappy supporters. Royle dropped Southall from the team despite the show of support, though he rejected a transfer offer from Chelsea, who were prepared to double Southall's wages. Caretaker-manager Dave Watson restored Southall to the starting line-up after Royle's resignation, and steered the club away from relegation.

Howard Kendall returned to manage Everton for the 1997–98 season and initially dropped Southall. However, Southall regained his place and had a memorable match playing against Coventry City on 25 October; Southall was "in inspired form" and kept a clean sheet. Southall played in the Everton goal for the final time on 29 November in a 2–0 defeat at home to Tottenham Hotspur. Thomas Myhre took his place in goal, and Southall rejected a coaching role at the club to search for first-team football elsewhere.

In December 1997, Southall went to Alvin Martin's Southend United of the Second Division on loan. He made 9 appearances in a brief stay at Roots Hall. He joined Chris Kamara's First Division Stoke City in February 1998. Kamara resigned two months later, and caretaker manager Alan Durban pulled Southall aside on his first day in charge to say "I'll let you manage the reserves, so long as you keep your head down, do whatever I tell you, and I won't tell everybody you're a bad influence". Southall was shocked by Durban's words and could not explain his attitude. Both Southend and Stoke would end the season bottom of their respective divisions and Everton only avoided relegation on the last day of the season. He left the Britannia Stadium in the summer and later said, "one of the worst episodes of my life had drawn to a close".

=== Later years ===
Former teammate Ian Snodin invited him to join Conference side Doncaster Rovers on a short-term deal at the start of the 1998–99 season. He signed with Wes Saunders's Torquay United of the Third Division in December 1998. He saved a penalty on his debut at Plainmoor in a 2–0 win over Hull City and signed a contract lasting until the end of the 1998–99 campaign. He was named Torquay's Player of the Year at the end of the season. However, on 29 January 2000, he picked up a concussion in a 2–1 defeat to Chester City at the Deva Stadium, and was substituted. Though he recovered from his injury after the match, he left the club not long afterwards.

Southall made a return to the Premier League by signing with Bradford City as a player-coach, helping to coach Aidan Davison, Matt Clarke and Gary Walsh. Clarke and Walsh picked up injuries and Davison was unable to agree a permanent deal after an initial loan, leaving manager Paul Jewell no choice but to play Southall at Valley Parade on 12 March 2000, against Leeds United. At the age of 41 years and 178 days he became the fourth oldest player in Premier League history. Leeds won 2–1, and Southall was criticised in the media for being too overweight to play professionally. He left Bradford at the end of the 2000–01 season after falling out with new boss Jim Jefferies.

== International career ==
Wales manager Mike England preferred Dai Davies in goal as Southall began to play first-team football at Everton. Southall only got a run of games once Davies retired. His first cap came against Northern Ireland at the Racecourse Ground, Wrexham on 27 May 1982 in the 1982 British Home Championship, Wales won 3–0.

Wales came close to qualifying for the 1986 FIFA World Cup despite losing their opening qualifying games away to Iceland and Spain. Wales then beat Iceland at Ninian Park, before recording a surprise 1–0 win over Scotland at Hampden Park with a single Ian Rush goal. A 3–0 win over Spain at the Racecourse Ground meant that Wales could secure qualification by beating Scotland in their final qualification game at Ninian Park. However, a draw would not be enough. The game ended in a 1–1 draw after a late Davie Cooper penalty cancelled out Mark Hughes's opener; Southall got a hand to the penalty, but could not keep it out. However, the result of the game was put into perspective when Scotland manager Jock Stein suffered a heart attack at the end of the game and died shortly afterwards.

Wales came close to qualifying for UEFA Euro 1988, which would have been the first UEFA European Football Championship in the nation's history. Going into the final two qualifying games, Wales led their group. Southall was injured and so missed the match against Denmark in Copenhagen, which ended in a 1–0 defeat with Eddie Niedzwiecki in goal. Southall returned to play the final game, a 2–0 defeat to Czechoslovakia in Prague which left Wales two points short of group winners Denmark. Manager Mike England was then replaced by Terry Yorath, who also made Southall a virtual ever-present in the Wales goal.

In qualifying for the 1990 FIFA World Cup, Wales faced Netherlands, West Germany and Finland. They failed to win a game and finished bottom of the group, though Southall did get the chance to play against some of the world's best players in Ruud Gullit, Marco van Basten, Frank Rijkaard, Rudi Völler, Andreas Möller, Andreas Brehme, and Jürgen Klinsmann.

In qualifying for UEFA Euro 1992, Wales were placed in the same group as World Champions Germany and finished just one point behind the Germans after conceding just six goals in their six games. Wales beat Germany 1–0 at the Cardiff Arms Park on 5 June 1991, and three months later beat Brazil in a friendly by the same scoreline. The game which settled the qualifying group came in Nuremberg on 16 October 1991. Wales lost 4–1 to the Germans, ending Southall's Wales record run of 385 minutes without conceding an international goal.

Wales were seen to have their best chance of reaching a major tournament after their group was selected for qualification for the 1994 FIFA World Cup. However, a Gheorghe Hagi-inspired Romania defeated Wales 5–1 in Bucharest to open the Wales campaign. Victories over the Faroe Islands and Belgium and two draws with the Representation of Czechs and Slovaks put Wales back on track, and a victory over Romania in Cardiff in the last game of the tournament would be enough to secure a place in the World Cup. However, Southall allowed a 25 yards (23 m) strike from Hagi slip under his body and into the net and was nutmegged by Florin Răducioiu as Wales were beaten 2–1. Once again a death put Welsh footballing hopes into perspective, as Southall attended the funeral of retired postman John Hill, who was killed after being struck by a flare released at the end of the match.

Manager Terry Yorath was replaced by John Toshack, who stuck with Southall but resigned after just 48 days after falling out with the Football Association of Wales. Results went badly under the new boss Mike Smith, despite a 2–0 victory over Albania in the first game of qualifying for UEFA Euro 1996. An embarrassing 3–2 defeat to Moldova was followed by a heavy 5–0 loss to Georgia. Two defeats to Bulgaria ended faint hopes of qualification and cost Smith his job.

Southall applied for the vacant position, but Bobby Gould was chosen instead, who named Southall and Ian Rush his assistants. He tried Danny Coyne, Andy Marriott and Tony Roberts in goal in friendly games, but selected Southall for the World Cup qualifying wins over San Marino. A month away from his 39th birthday, he won his final cap against Turkey on 20 August 1997; the Turks won 6–4. Southall only played the first half as Gould blamed him for the three goals he conceded – his replacement Paul Jones went on to concede three himself in the second half. Southall's 92 Welsh caps were a national record until surpassed by Chris Gunter in November 2018. Southall conceded 126 goals, an average of 1.34 per match. The 1958 FIFA World Cup was the only time until the end of his career that Wales qualified for a major tournament, and the British Home Championship was played for the final time in 1984, therefore the majority of Southall's caps came in friendlies or qualifying games.

== Style of play ==
Southall was renowned for his shot-stopping ability, particularly in dealing with one-on-one situations, quickly coming off his line to intimidate the onrushing forward and relying on his instinctive reactions to save the ball. He would spend hours reading books about boxing and golf to improve his balance and spring, and would focus on improving minor pieces of kit and behaviour, saying that "If I changed 100 things and got 1% better because of one of them, then it was worth it".

== Coaching and management career ==
Southall was appointed caretaker manager of Wales, alongside Mark Hughes, following the resignation of Bobby Gould after a 4–0 defeat against Italy on 5 June 1999. In his only game in charge, Wales lost 2–0 to Denmark at Anfield on 9 June 1999, and Mark Hughes was appointed as manager on a full-time basis. During his time playing for Torquay United he also worked as a goalkeeping coach at Huddersfield Town and Tranmere Rovers. He later became a player-coach at York City, Rhyl, Shrewsbury Town and Dagenham & Redbridge.

He was appointed manager of Conference club Dover Athletic in December 2001. His managing stint at the Kent club was short, and he was sacked in March 2002, after only a few months in charge, after the club's new owners decided to promote his assistant Clive Walker. He later made cameo appearances as a player at Canvey Island, where he was also a goalkeeping coach from 2002 to 2004. He also began teaching young people from deprived backgrounds how to coach in a community scheme called Soccer Skills, and later worked in the special education sector. He set up his own educational consultancy that specialised in working with NEETs, in partnership with Brooklands College.

He had spells as coach with all youth Wales national teams from U16 to U19, but quit his post from Wales U19 in November 2004, claiming he was treated with "a total lack of respect" and that the coaching was compromised because "...as always, it's about money." FAW management committee chairman Ken Tucker issued a rebuke, saying: "Nev is making comments on things he knows little about. It is sad when people make comments without any knowledge of the finances of the FAW."

A month after resigning from the national scene, Southall returned to management with Hastings United. However, just one year on he was sacked, with the Hastings chairman saying that "there have recently been an increasing number of issues on which Neville and I have disagreed and it had got to the point where our working relationship had broken down, beyond the point of repair, as far as I was concerned".

In November 2008, Margate manager Terry Yorath appointed Southall as his assistant in the Isthmian League. In September 2009, he became the caretaker manager after Yorath resigned as manager.

== Personal life ==
Southall married Eryl Williams in June 1980. The couple had a daughter, Samantha, in 1987. He admitted to having affairs throughout the 18-year marriage and left Eryl for another woman, an aromatherapist named Emma in 1998. In addition to the daughter from his first marriage, he and his second wife also act as foster parents: a 2018 interview reported that they were looking after two children.

Southall is a teetotaller; this fact, coupled with his shy personality and dedication to football, gave him a reputation as a loner. In August 2012, his autobiography The Binman Chronicles was released. It was the sixth best-selling football book of 2012.

In 2014, Southall started working as a teaching assistant at Canolfan Yr Afon, the Pupil Referral Unit for Blaenau Gwent, based in Ebbw Vale, helping pupils with their job-seeking and soft skills, and liaising with local businesses to arrange work placements. He had previously worked in a similar role in London.

=== Political activism ===
He is a member of the trade union UNISON and serves as international officer for his branch.

In May 2017, Southall endorsed Labour Party leader Jeremy Corbyn in the 2017 UK general election. He was impressed by Labour's plans to commit 5% of Premier League football's £8.3 billion broadcasting revenue back into the grassroots game, among other reasons. He subsequently said the following year: "Jeremy Corbyn's done all right. Whether you like him or hate him, he sticks to what he says."

He is active on social media as a supporter of various charitable causes and LGBT rights, and has handed over his Twitter account to people from marginalised groups and organisations that work to support them, in order to give them a platform to answer questions from the public, including members of the LGBT community, a drugs helpline, a suicide bereavement charity, and a sex workers' collective.

Southall is a prominent supporter of Welsh independence and has spoken at multiple events advocating for it.

In 2018 Southall supported the choice of Wrexham as location for the Welsh football museum.

== Career statistics ==
=== Club ===
Appearances and goals by club, season and competition
Club	Season	League			National cup (Note: Includes FA Cup, Welsh Cup)		League cup (Note: Includes Football League Cup, Welsh League Cup)		Europe (Note: Includes UEFA Cup Winners' Cup)		Other		Total	
Club	Season	Division	Apps	Goals	Apps	Goals	Apps	Goals	Apps	Goals	Apps	Goals	Apps	Goals
Llandudno Swifts (Note: Neville Southall started his playing career at the age of 12.)	1970–71	Welsh League North												
Llandudno Swifts	1971–72	Welsh League North												
Llandudno Swifts	1972–73	Welsh League North												
Llandudno Town	1973–74	Welsh League North												
Bangor City (Note: Neville Southall played in at least 6 matches for Bangor City.)	1974–75	Northern Premier League												
Bangor City	1975–76	Northern Premier League												
Bangor City	1976–77	Northern Premier League	6	0									6+	0
Conwy United	1976–77	Vale of Conwy Football League												
Conwy United	1977–78	Welsh League North												
Conwy United	1978–79	Welsh League North												
Winsford United (Note: Neville Southall played in at least 3 matches for Winsford United.)	1979–80	Cheshire County League Division One	3	0									3+	0
Bury	1980–81	Fourth Division	39	0	5	0	0	0	—		5 (Note: Appearances in Anglo-Scottish Cup)	0	49	0
Everton	1981–82	First Division	26	0	1	0	0	0	—		—		27	0
Everton	1982–83	First Division	17	0	0	0	2	0	—		—		19	0
Everton	1983–84	First Division	35	0	8	0	11	0	—		—		54	0
Everton	1984–85	First Division	42	0	7	0	4	0	9	0	1 (Note: Appearance in Charity Shield)	0	63	0
Everton	1985–86	First Division	32	0	5	0	5	0	—		7 (Note: Six appearances in Football League Super Cup/Screen Sport Super Cup, one in Charity Shield)	0	49	0
Everton	1986–87	First Division	31	0	3	0	3	0	—		2 (Note: Appearances in Full Members' Cup)	0	39	0
Everton	1987–88	First Division	32	0	8	0	7	0	—		1	0	48	0
Everton	1988–89	First Division	38	0	8	0	5	0	—		4 (Note: One appearances in Football League Centenary Trophy, three in Full Members' Cup)	0	55	0
Everton	1989–90	First Division	38	0	7	0	4	0	—		—		49	0
Everton	1990–91	First Division	38	0	6	0	3	0	—		6	0	53	0
Everton	1991–92	First Division	42	0	2	0	4	0	—		2	0	50	0
Everton	1992–93	Premier League	40	0	1	0	6	0	—		—		47	0
Everton	1993–94	Premier League	42	0	2	0	4	0	—		—		48	0
Everton	1994–95	Premier League	41	0	6	0	2	0	—		—		49	0
Everton	1995–96	Premier League	38	0	4	0	2	0	4	0	1	0	49	0
Everton	1996–97	Premier League	34	0	2	0	2	0	—		—		38	0
Everton	1997–98	Premier League	12	0	0	0	1	0	—		—		13	0
Everton	Total		578	0	70	0	65	0	13	0	24	0	750	0
Port Vale (loan)	1982–83	Fourth Division	9	0	—		—		—		—		9	0
Southend United (loan)	1997–98	Second Division	9	0	—		—		—		—		9	0
Stoke City	1997–98	First Division	12	0	—		—		—		—		12	0
Doncaster Rovers	1998–99	Conference	9	0	0	0	—		—		0	0	9	0
Torquay United	1998–99	Third Division	25	0	0	0	0	0	—		2 (Note: Appearances in Football League Trophy)	0	27	0
Torquay United	1999–2000	Third Division	28	0	4	0	2	0	—		0	0	34	0
Torquay United	Total		53	0	4	0	2	0	—		2	0	61	0
Huddersfield Town	1998–1999	First Division												
Bradford City	1999–2000	Premier League	1	0	—		—		—		—		1	0
York City	2000–01	Third Division												
Rhyl	2001–02	League of Wales	3	0	0	0	—		—		0	0	3	0
Shrewsbury Town	2001–02	Third Division												
Dover Athletic	2001–02	Conference												
Dagenham & Redbridge	2001–02	Conference												
Career total			722+	0	79+	0	67+	0	13	0	31+	0	912+	0

=== International ===
Appearances and goals by national team and year
National team	Year	Apps	Goals
Wales	1982	2	0
Wales	1983	9	0
Wales	1984	8	0
Wales	1985	6	0
Wales	1986	2	0
Wales	1987	5	0
Wales	1988	4	0
Wales	1989	5	0
Wales	1990	6	0
Wales	1991	8	0
Wales	1992	9	0
Wales	1993	7	0
Wales	1994	7	0
Wales	1995	6	0
Wales	1996	6	0
Wales	1997	2	0
Total		92	0

== Honours ==
In December 2004 he was voted as Everton's all-time cult hero. He holds numerous Everton club records, including: most league appearances (578), most FA Cup appearances (70), most League Cup appearances (65), and most clean sheets (269). He is named on the Gwladys Street's Hall of Fame. In 1998, he was named as one of the Football League 100 Legends. In 1999, World Soccer magazine named him joint 95th (with László Kubala) in the 'Greatest Players of the 20th Century'. In the IFFHS World's Best Goalkeeper rankings he was listed fifth in 1987, seventh in 1988, ninth in 1989, and fourth in 1991. He was voted FWA Footballer of the Year in 1985, making him the last goalkeeper to be given the award. He was voted BBC Wales Sports Personality of the Year in 1995.

Winsford United

- Cheshire Senior Cup: 1980

Everton

- Football League First Division: 1984–85, 1986–87
- FA Cup: 1983–84, 1994–95; runner-up: 1984–85, 1988–89
- FA Charity Shield: 1984, 1985, 1995
- European Cup Winners' Cup: 1984–85
- Football League Cup runner-up: 1983–84
- Full Members' Cup runner-up: 1988–89, 1990–91

Individual

- Winsford United Player of the Year: 1979–80
- Bury Player of the Year: 1980–81
- Bury Young Player of the Year: 1980–81
- FWA Footballer of the Year: 1985
- Ballon d'Or Nominated: 1985, 1987
- PFA Team of the Year: 1986–87 First Division, 1987–88 First Division, 1988–89 First Division, 1989–90 First Division
- BBC Wales Sports Personality of the Year: 1995
- Torquay United Player of the Year: 1998–99
- Football League 100 Legends
- Gwladys Street's Hall of Fame
- World Soccer 'Greatest Players of the 20th Century': 95th
- English Football Hall of Fame: 2016
- Welsh Sports Hall of Fame: 2016

== See also ==
- List of men's footballers with the most official appearances
