= Jamie Speare =

English footballer

Personal information
- Full name: James Speare
- Date of birth: 5 November 1976 (age 49)
- Place of birth: Liverpool, England
- Height: 6 ft 1 in (1.85 m)
- Position: Goalkeeper

Senior career*
| Years | Team | Apps | (Gls) |
| 1995–1997 | Everton | 0 | (0) |
| 1997 | Darlington | 2 | (0) |
| 1997–1998 | Sligo Rovers | | |
| 1998–2004 | Accrington Stanley | 306 | |
| 2004–2005 | Lancaster City | 56 | |
| 2005–2006 | Southport | 2 | (0) |
| 2006–2008 | Barrow | 54 | |
| 2008–2009 | Accrington Stanley | 0 | (0) |
| 2011 | Accrington Stanley | 0 | (0) |
| 2013 | Accrington Stanley | 0 | (0) |
| | Colwyn Bay | 2 | (0) |
- * Club domestic league appearances and goals as of 17:00, 10 October 2014 (UTC)

James Speare (born 5 November 1976) is an English former footballer who played as a goalkeeper.

== Career ==
Having left Everton as a trainee in 1997, Speare joined Darlington making two appearances in the 1996–97 season. He then moved over to Ireland and joined Sligo Rovers.

Following a move to then non-league side Accrington Stanley in 1998, Speare played in almost 300 games over a 6-year period until the summer of 2004.

Speare has since appeared for a number of lower league clubs including Southport, Lancaster City and Barrow amongst others.

Following a goalkeeper injury crisis at Accrington Stanley in the winter of 2008 Speare re-joined the club on a short-term contract, despite not making an appearance he was a regular on the substitutes bench until his release in January 2009.

In November 2011 following an injury to Ian Dunbavin Speare re-joined the club for a third time on another short-term deal, making the substitutes bench again on 12 November 2011 in a 1st Round FA Cup tie against Notts County.

On 12 October 2013, Jamie joined Cammell Laird as a goalkeeping coach. In October 2014 he followed manager Tony Sullivan to Witton Albion.
