= 1983–84 Football League Cup =

Milk Cup, League Cup
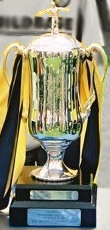
- The Milk Cup

Tournament details
- Country: England; Wales
- Teams: 92

Final positions
- Champions: Liverpool (4th title)
- Runners-up: Everton

Tournament statistics
- Goals scored: Ian Rush (8 goals)

The 1983–84 Football League Cup (known as the Milk Cup for sponsorship reasons) was the 24th season of the Football League Cup, a knockout competition for England's top 92 football clubs. The competition started on 29 August 1983 and ended with the final replay 28 March 1984.

First Division teams Everton and Liverpool contested on 28 March 1984 at Wembley Stadium in London the Final. This was the first final ever to be staged on a Sunday and the first time that the final was broadcast live on British TV. Liverpool beat Everton 1–0 after a replay, to win their fourth consecutive League Cup title.

== First round ==
=== First leg ===
Home team	Score	Away team	Date
Aldershot	3–1	Leyton Orient	30 August 1983
Blackpool	2–1	Walsall	30 August 1983
Bolton Wanderers	3–0	Chester City	30 August 1983
Bournemouth	1–2	Bristol Rovers	30 August 1983
Bradford City	0–1	Sheffield United	29 August 1983
Brentford	3–0	Charlton Athletic	30 August 1983
Colchester United	3–2	Reading	30 August 1983
Crewe Alexandra	1–0	Burnley	30 August 1983
Crystal Palace	3–0	Peterborough United	30 August 1983
Exeter City	2–3	Cardiff City	31 August 1983
Gillingham	1–2	Chelsea	30 August 1983
Halifax Town	0–1	Darlington	30 August 1983
Hereford United	3–2	Portsmouth	31 August 1983
Hull City	0–0	Lincoln City	30 August 1983
Mansfield Town	1–2	Huddersfield Town	30 August 1983
Middlesbrough	0–1	Chesterfield	30 August 1983
Millwall	3–0	Northampton Town	29 August 1983
Newport County	2–3	Torquay United	30 August 1983
Oxford United	1–1	Bristol City	31 August 1983
Port Vale	3–1	Wrexham	31 August 1983
Preston North End	1–0	Tranmere Rovers	30 August 1983
Rochdale	0–3	Stockport County	30 August 1983
Rotherham United	0–0	Hartlepool United	30 August 1983
Scunthorpe United	1–1	Doncaster Rovers	30 August 1983
Southend United	1–0	Wimbledon	29 August 1983
Swindon Town	1–0	Plymouth Argyle	30 August 1983
Wigan Athletic	1–2	Bury	30 August 1983
York City	2–1	Grimsby Town	30 August 1983

=== Second leg ===
Home team	Score	Away team	Date	Agg
Bristol City	0–1	Oxford United	12 September 1983	1–2
Bristol Rovers	2–2	Bournemouth	13 September 1983	4–3
Burnley	3–4	Crewe Alexandra	13 September 1983	3–5
Bury	2–0	Wigan Athletic	13 September 1983	4–1
Cardiff City	2–1	Exeter City	13 September 1983	5–3
Charlton Athletic	2–1	Brentford	13 September 1983	2–4
Chelsea	4–0	Gillingham	13 September 1983	6–1
Chester City	3–0	Bolton Wanderers	14 September 1983	3–3
Chesterfield	0–1	Middlesbrough	13 September 1983	1–1
Darlington	3–2	Halifax Town	13 September 1983	4–2
Doncaster Rovers	3–0	Scunthorpe United	13 September 1983	4–1
Grimsby Town	2–0	York City	13 September 1983	3–2
Hartlepool United	0–1	Rotherham United	14 September 1983	0–1
Huddersfield Town	5–1	Mansfield Town	13 September 1983	7–2
Leyton Orient	3–3	Aldershot	13 September 1983	4–6
Lincoln City	3–1	Hull City	14 September 1983	3–1
Northampton Town	1–2	Millwall	13 September 1983	1–5
Peterborough United	3–0	Crystal Palace	14 September 1983	3–3
Plymouth Argyle	4–1	Swindon Town	13 September 1983	4–2
Portsmouth	3–1	Hereford United	13 September 1983	5–4
Reading	4–3	Colchester United	14 September 1983	6–6
Sheffield United	1–1	Bradford City	13 September 1983	2–1
Stockport County	2–2	Rochdale	12 September 1983	5–2
Torquay United	1–0	Newport County	14 September 1983	4–2
Tranmere Rovers	0–0	Preston North End	12 September 1983	0–1
Walsall	3–1	Blackpool	13 September 1983	4–3
Wimbledon	6–4	Southend United	13 September 1983	6–5
Wrexham	1–5	Port Vale	13 September 1983	2–8

== Second round ==
=== First leg ===
Home team	Score	Away team	Date
Aldershot	2–4	Notts County	4 October 1983
Brentford	1–4	Liverpool	5 October 1983
Brighton & Hove Albion	4–2	Bristol Rovers	4 October 1983
Bury	1–2	West Ham United	4 October 1983
Cambridge United	2–3	Sunderland	4 October 1983
Cardiff City	0–0	Norwich City	4 October 1983
Carlisle United	2–0	Southampton	4 October 1983
Chesterfield	0–1	Everton	4 October 1983
Derby County	0–3	Birmingham City	5 October 1983
Doncaster Rovers	1–3	Fulham	5 October 1983
Grimsby Town	0–0	Coventry City	4 October 1983
Huddersfield Town	2–1	Watford	4 October 1983
Ipswich Town	4–3	Blackburn Rovers	5 October 1983
Leeds United	0–1	Chester City	5 October 1983
Leicester City	0–2	Chelsea	5 October 1983
Millwall	3–0	West Bromwich Albion	4 October 1983
Newcastle United	1–1	Oxford United	5 October 1983
Plymouth Argyle	1–1	Arsenal	4 October 1983
Port Vale	0–1	Manchester United	3 October 1983
Portsmouth	2–2	Aston Villa	4 October 1983
Queens Park Rangers	8–1	Crewe Alexandra	4 October 1983
Rotherham United	2–3	Luton Town	4 October 1983
Sheffield Wednesday	3–0	Darlington	4 October 1983
Shrewsbury Town	2–1	Sheffield United	4 October 1983
Stockport County	0–2	Oldham Athletic	3 October 1983
Stoke City	0–0	Peterborough United	5 October 1983
Swansea City	1–1	Colchester United	4 October 1983
Torquay United	0–0	Manchester City	5 October 1983
Tottenham Hotspur	3–1	Lincoln City	5 October 1983
Walsall	1–0	Barnsley	4 October 1983
Wimbledon	2–0	Nottingham Forest	4 October 1983
Wolverhampton Wanderers	2–3	Preston North End	4 October 1983

=== Second leg ===
Home team	Score	Away team	Date	Agg
Arsenal	1–0	Plymouth Argyle	25 October 1983	2–1
Aston Villa	3-2	Portsmouth	26 October 1983	5–4
Barnsley	0–2	Walsall	25 October 1983	0–3
Birmingham City	4–0	Derby County	25 October 1983	7–0
Blackburn Rovers	1–2	Ipswich Town	26 October 1983	4–6
Bristol Rovers	2–1	Brighton & Hove Albion	25 October 1983	4–5
Chelsea	0–2	Leicester City	25 October 1983	2–2
Chester City	1–4	Leeds United	26 October 1983	2–4
Colchester United	1–0	Swansea City	25 October 1983	2–1
Coventry City	2–1	Grimsby Town	25 October 1983	2–1
Crewe Alexandra	3–0	Queens Park Rangers	25 October 1983	4–8
Darlington	2–4	Sheffield Wednesday	25 October 1983	2–7
Everton	2–2	Chesterfield	26 October 1983	3–2
Fulham	3–1	Doncaster Rovers	26 October 1983	6–2
Lincoln City	2–1	Tottenham Hotspur	26 October 1983	3–4
Liverpool	4–0	Brentford	25 October 1983	8–1
Luton Town	0–2	Rotherham United	25 October 1983	3–4
Manchester City	6–0	Torquay United	25 October 1983	6–0
Manchester United	2–0	Port Vale	26 October 1983	3–0
Norwich City	3–0	Cardiff City	26 October 1983	3–0
Nottingham Forest	1–1	Wimbledon	26 October 1983	1–3
Notts County	4–1	Aldershot	25 October 1983	8–3
Oldham Athletic	2–2	Stockport County	25 October 1983	4–2
Oxford United	2–1	Newcastle United	26 October 1983	3–2
Peterborough United	1–2	Stoke City	26 October 1983	1–2
Preston North End	1–0	Wolverhampton Wanderers	25 October 1983	4–2
Sheffield United	2–2	Shrewsbury Town	25 October 1983	3–4
Southampton	3–0	Carlisle United	25 October 1983	3–2
Sunderland	4–3	Cambridge United	26 October 1983	7–5
Watford	2–2	Huddersfield Town	25 October 1983	3–4
West Bromwich Albion	5–1	Millwall	25 October 1983	5–4
West Ham United	10–0	Bury	25 October 1983	12–1

== Third round ==
=== Ties ===
Home team	Score	Away team	Date
Aston Villa	3–0	Manchester City	9 November 1983
Birmingham City	2–2	Notts County	8 November 1983
Chelsea	0–1	West Bromwich Albion	9 November 1983
Colchester United	0–2	Manchester United	8 November 1983
Everton	2–1	Coventry City	9 November 1983
Fulham	1–1	Liverpool	8 November 1983
Ipswich Town	3–2	Queens Park Rangers	9 November 1983
Leeds United	1–1	Oxford United	9 November 1983
Norwich City	0–0	Sunderland	9 November 1983
Preston North End	0–2	Sheffield Wednesday	8 November 1983
Rotherham United	2–1	Southampton	8 November 1983
Stoke City	0–0	Huddersfield Town	8 November 1983
Tottenham Hotspur	1–2	Arsenal	9 November 1983
Walsall	2–1	Shrewsbury Town	8 November 1983
West Ham United	1–0	Brighton & Hove Albion	8 November 1983
Wimbledon	3–1	Oldham Athletic	8 November 1983

=== Replays ===
Home team	Score	Away team	Date
Huddersfield Town	0–2	Stoke City	22 November 1983
Liverpool	1–1	Fulham	22 November 1983
Notts County	0–0	Birmingham City	22 November 1983
Oxford United	4–1	Leeds United	23 November 1983
Sunderland	1–2	Norwich City	22 November 1983

=== 2nd Replays ===
Home team	Score	Away team	Date
Birmingham City	0–0	Notts County	29 November 1983
Fulham	0–1	Liverpool	29 November 1983

=== 3rd Replay ===
Home team	Score	Away team	Date
Notts County	1–3	Birmingham City	5 December 1983

== Fourth round ==
=== Ties ===
Home team	Score	Away team	Date
Arsenal	1–2	Walsall	29 November 1983
Birmingham City	1–1	Liverpool	20 December 1983
Ipswich Town	0–1	Norwich City	30 November 1983
Oxford United	1–1	Manchester United	30 November 1983
Rotherham United	1–0	Wimbledon	29 November 1983
Stoke City	0–1	Sheffield Wednesday	30 November 1983
West Bromwich Albion	1–2	Aston Villa	30 November 1983
West Ham United	2–2	Everton	30 November 1983

=== Replays ===
Home team	Score	Away team	Date
Everton	2–0	West Ham United	6 December 1983
Liverpool	3–0	Birmingham City	22 December 1983
Manchester United	1–1	Oxford United	7 December 1983

=== 2nd Replay ===
Home team	Score	Away team	Date
Oxford United	2–1	Manchester United	19 December 1983

== Fifth Round ==
=== Ties ===
Home team	Score	Away team	Date
Norwich City	0–2	Aston Villa	17 January 1984
Oxford United	1–1	Everton	18 January 1984
Rotherham United	2–4	Walsall	18 January 1984
Sheffield Wednesday	2–2	Liverpool	17 January 1984

=== Replays ===
Home team	Score	Away team	Date
Everton	4–1	Oxford United	24 January 1984
Liverpool	3–0	Sheffield Wednesday	25 January 1984

== Semi-finals ==
Having already defeated Arsenal, Third Division underdogs Walsall were now faced with a visit to Anfield to take on Liverpool, winners for the previous three years, in the semi-finals. They held the hosts to a 2–2 draw before losing the return leg 2–0 at Fellows Park. In the other semi-final, Everton won the first leg 2–0 against Aston Villa and went through despite a 1–0 defeat in the return leg, setting the scene for the first major domestic cup final between the two Merseyside clubs.

=== First leg ===
Home team	Score	Away team	Date
Everton	2–0	Aston Villa	15 February 1984
Liverpool	2–2	Walsall	7 February 1984

=== Second leg ===
Home team	Score	Away team	Date	Agg
Aston Villa	1–0	Everton	22 February 1984	1–2
Walsall	0–2	Liverpool	14 February 1984	2–4

== Final ==
25 March 1984
14:30

Liverpool	0–0 (a.e.t.)	Everton
	Report

Wembley Stadium, London
Attendance: 100,000
Referee: Alan Robinson (Waterlooville)

=== Replay ===
28 March 1984
19:30

Liverpool	1–0	Everton
Souness 21'	Report

Maine Road, Manchester
Attendance: 52,089
Referee: Alan Robinson (Waterlooville)
