= Graeme Sharp =

Scottish footballer and manager

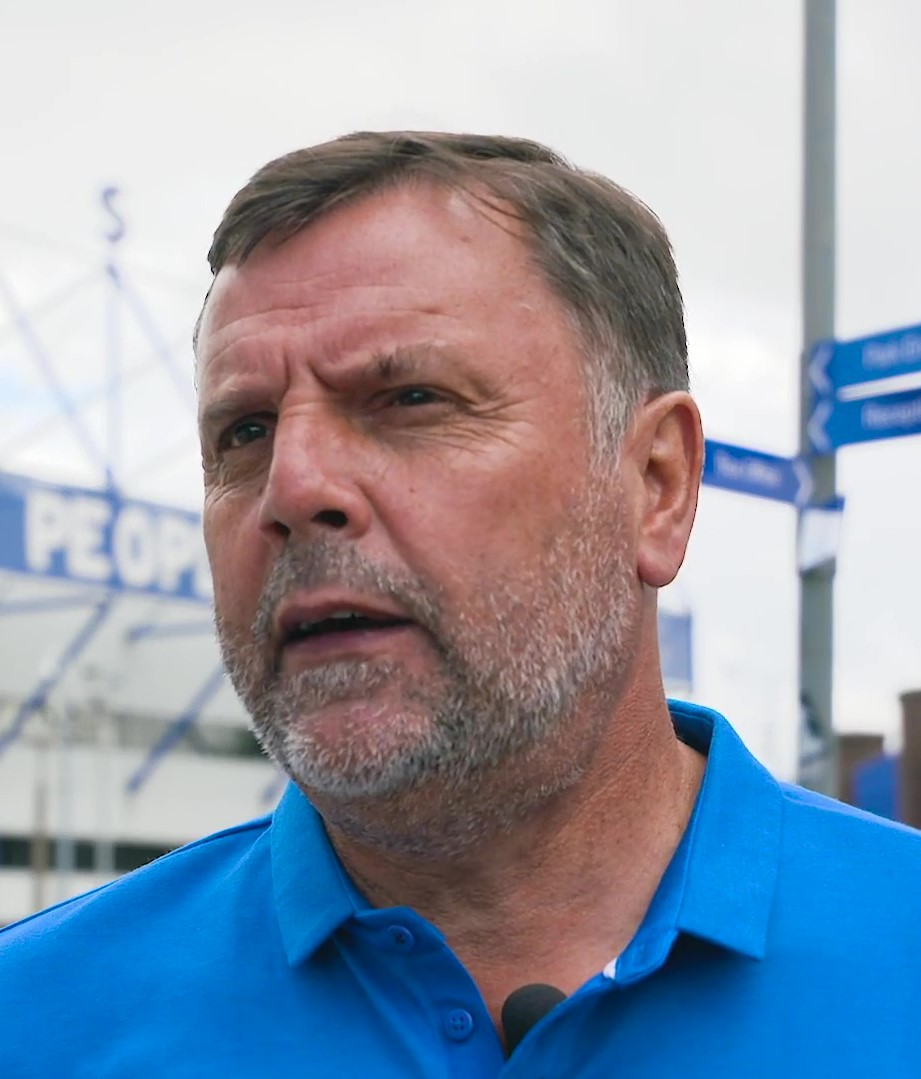
- Sharp in 2018

Personal information
- Full name: Graeme Marshall Sharp
- Date of birth: 16 October 1960 (age 66)
- Place of birth: Glasgow, Scotland
- Height: 6 ft 1 in (1.85 m)
- Position: Forward

Senior career*
Years	Team	Apps	(Gls)
1978–1980	Dumbarton	40	(17)
1980–1991	Everton	322	(111)
1991–1997	Oldham Athletic	107	(30)
1997	Bangor City	0	(0)
Total		469	(158)

International career
1982	Scotland U21	1	(1)
1985–1988	Scotland	12	(1)

Managerial career
- 1994–1997: Oldham Athletic
- 1997–1998: Bangor City
- * Club domestic league appearances and goals

Graeme Marshall Sharp (born 16 October 1960) is a Scottish former professional football player and manager. Sharp played as a forward for Dumbarton, Everton, Oldham Athletic and Bangor City. He enjoyed great success with Everton, helping them win English league championships in 1985 and 1987, the FA Cup in 1984 and the European Cup Winners' Cup in 1985. He made 12 international appearances for Scotland, and was selected in their 1986 World Cup squad.

Sharp moved to Oldham Athletic in 1991, and helped the newly-promoted club stay in the top flight for three seasons. He was appointed player-manager of Oldham in November 1994, but he left the club in March 1997 with them on the verge of being relegated to the third tier. Sharp was then player-manager of Welsh club Bangor City for a year. He has since worked in media coverage of football and as a club ambassador for Everton.

== Club career ==
=== Everton ===
Sharp was born in Glasgow. He started his playing career at Dumbarton before signing for Everton for £120,000 in 1980. He did not immediately become a first team player at Goodison Park, and by the end of the 1980–81 season had still made just six league appearances for the club. But new manager Howard Kendall soon selected Sharp as a regular striker and was rewarded handsomely as Sharp netted 15 goals in 29 league games. The goals continued to flow over the next nine seasons.

Sharp's greatest achievements were as part of the Everton team which in 1984 won the FA Cup (he scored the first goal in the final), in 1985 and 1987 won the Football League First Division and also in 1985 the European Cup Winners' Cup. In October 1984, he scored the lone goal in Everton's first win at Anfield since 1970. He was on the losing side in the FA Cup finals of 1986 and 1989, with both of these finals being won by Everton's local rivals Liverpool. His key role in this golden era led to his inclusion in Everton's "Greatest Ever Team", following a poll in the club's 125th anniversary.

After Gary Lineker's departure to FC Barcelona in the 1986 close season, Sharp had a succession of strike partners. First he played alongside Paul Wilkinson, Adrian Heath (also a midfielder) and then Wayne Clarke before the arrival of £2million Tony Cottee for the start of the 1988–89 season. This was the season where Everton were on the losing side in two Wembley finals – first they lost 4–3 to Nottingham Forest in the Full Members Cup final (in which Sharp scored a goal) and then they were beaten 3–2 by Liverpool in the second all Merseyside FA Cup final in four seasons.

Despite the arrival of another striker – Mike Newell – a year later, Sharp remained a regular player with 33 games and six goals in the 1989–90 season in a three-man attack. For a while it looked as though Sharp could be on the verge of another title triumph with Everton as they went top of the league in late autumn 1989 but they failed to sustain their title challenge and finished sixth as Liverpool sealed their 18th league title. He remained a regular player in 1990–91, though his 27 league appearances delivered just three goals. With speculation that manager Howard Kendall (who had returned in November 1990 more than three years after leaving Everton) was about to sign Dean Saunders, it appeared that Sharp's days at Goodison Park were numbered. Sharp did not appear to be part Kendall's future plans and he departed to Oldham Athletic (managed by former Everton player Joe Royle) in July 1991, allowing new signing Peter Beardsley, along with Tony Cottee and Mike Newell, to start the 1991–92 season as Everton's strikeforce.

Sharp was regarded as good in the air and able to hold the ball well and distribute it to provide more scoring opportunities for others than for himself. He formed successful scoring partnerships with Andy Gray, Adrian Heath and Gary Lineker. In the 1984–85 season Sharp scored 30 goals in 54 matches. In 426 appearances for Everton (21 as substitute), Sharp scored 159 goals to set a post war goalscoring for Everton which has yet to be matched. Only Dixie Dean (pre Second World War) has ever scored more goals for the club than Sharp did. As well as winning two league titles, a European Cup Winners' Cup and an FA Cup with Everton (and collecting three runners-up medals in the FA Cup and another in the League Cup), Sharp's exploits also included a four-goal yield in a 4–0 league win at Southampton in October 1987, his first Everton hat-trick in a 5–2 home win over Newcastle United in December 1986, a hat-trick in an FA Cup fourth round win at Sheffield Wednesday in January 1988 and a hat-trick against Wrexham in the League Cup during his final season on Merseyside.

=== Oldham Athletic ===
Oldham Athletic paid £500,000 for Sharp just after their promotion to the First Division after a 68-year exile. He helped them finish 17th in 1991–92, ensuring that they would be members of the new Premier League. He helped them avoid relegation on goal difference in 1992–93, and reach the FA Cup semi-final a year later, although they were finally relegated to the new Division One at the end of the 1993–94 season.

When Joe Royle quit as Oldham manager to take over at Everton in November 1994, Sharp took over as player-manager at Boundary Park and they finished in midtable in 1994–95 – a disappointing showing for a side who had retained all but one of their key players (Mike Milligan) from the side that had been relegated from the Premier League and reached an FA Cup semi-final. Further disappointment came in 1995–96 when Oldham finished 18th, and Sharp finally walked in March of 1996–97 with Oldham on the verge of their imminent relegation to Division Two.

=== Bangor City ===
After coaching Oldham Athletic, Sharp later served as manager of Bangor City in the League of Wales for one season and led the club to a Welsh Cup victory in May 1998.

== International career ==
Sharp played 12 times for the Scotland national team between 1985 and 1988. This included one appearance in the 1986 World Cup, in a goalless draw against Uruguay. Sharp scored one international goal, in a 1–1 draw with Malta.

== Style of play ==
In a 2018 interview with FourFourTwo, Robbie Fowler described Sharp as one of his heroes growing up, commenting: "Graeme Sharpe [sic] was a fantastic centre-forward; he could hold up the ball, was good in the air and could finish with both feet." He was also regarded as being a good distributor of the ball, who was capable of creating scoring opportunities for other players as well as himself.

== Other activities ==
Sharp now works for the local press in Liverpool and radio for Radio City in the north-west of England and is one of the Everton Club Ambassadors alongside Ian Snodin and Graham Stuart. In January 2022, he was appointed as one of the club's directors.

== Honours ==
Everton

- Football League First Division: 1984–85, 1986–87
- FA Cup: 1983–84; runner-up: 1984–85, 1985–86, 1988–89
- FA Charity Shield: 1984, 1985, 1986, 1987
- European Cup Winners' Cup: 1984–85
- Football League Cup runner-up: 1983–84
- Full Members' Cup runner-up: 1988–89

Individual

- Everton Top Goal Scorer: 1981–82, 1982–83, 1984–85, 1987–88
- Goal of the Season: 1984–85 vs. Liverpool (Division One)
- PFA Team of the Year: 1987–88 First Division
