= 1993–94 Everton F.C. season =

English football club season

Everton
1993–94 season
- Chairman: David Marsh
- Manager: Howard Kendall (until 4 December 1993); Jimmy Gabriel (caretaker until 3 January 1994) Mike Walker (from 7 January 1994)
- Stadium: Goodison Park
- FA Premier League: 17th
- FA Cup: Third Round
- Coca–Cola Cup: Fourth Round
- Top goalscorer: League: Tony Cottee (16); All: Tony Cottee (19)
- Average home league attendance: 22,948

During the 1993–94 English football season, Everton F.C. competed in the FA Premier League.

== Season summary ==
After a strong initial start to the season, Everton's form drastically deteriorated, eventually leading to them being stuck in a relegation battle.

Legendary manager Howard Kendall resigned as head coach in December, just after they ended a five-match winless run, with the Toffees eleventh. This was followed by a poor run of results under the caretaker management of Jimmy Gabriel, leaving Everton just one place outside the relegation zone by the time Kendall's permanent successor was named.

Mike Walker was the successor in question, following a successful 18-month reign at Norwich City. Walker earned 11 points from his first 6 matches in charge, but another poor run of form saw Everton move into the relegation zone following the penultimate round of matches. This was the first time all season that the club had been in the bottom three.

On the last day of the season, Everton went 2–0 down to Wimbledon and looked all set for relegation. However, a controversial Graham Stuart penalty followed by a Barry Horne volley and a second goal for Stuart saw the Toffees achieve a 3–2 victory. With other matches on which Everton depended also having gone their way, the Toffees were safe, with the final relegation places going to Sheffield United and Oldham Athletic.

== Final league table ==
Pos	Team	Pld	W	D	L	GF	GA	GD	Pts
15	Tottenham Hotspur	42	11	12	19	54	59	−5	45
16	Manchester City	42	9	18	15	38	49	−11	45
17	Everton	42	12	8	22	42	63	−21	44
18	Southampton	42	12	7	23	49	66	−17	43
19	Ipswich Town	42	9	16	17	35	58	−23	43

Source: Premier League
Rules for classification: 1) points; 2) goal difference; 3) number of goals scored.

Results summary

Overall								Home						Away					
Pld	W	D	L	GF	GA	GD	Pts	W	D	L	GF	GA	GD	W	D	L	GF	GA	GD
42	12	8	22	42	63	−21	44	8	4	9	26	30	−4	4	4	13	16	33	−17

Source: 1993-94 FA Premier League table

Results by round

Round	1	2	3	4	5	6	7	8	9	10	11	12	13	14	15	16	17	18	19	20	21	22	23	24	25	26	27	28	29	30	31	32	33	34	35	36	37	38	39	40	41	42
Ground	A	H	H	A	A	H	A	H	H	A	A	H	A	A	H	H	A	H	A	A	H	H	A	H	A	H	A	H	H	H	H	A	A	H	A	A	H	A	A	H	A	H
Result	W	W	W	L	L	L	W	W	L	L	D	L	W	L	L	D	D	W	L	D	L	L	L	L	L	W	L	W	D	D	W	L	L	L	D	L	L	W	L	D	L	W
Position	5	2	1	4	8	10	7	4	8	10	12	12	11	12	13	12	12	11	13	13	15	16	16	16	16	16	16	15	15	15	14	15	15	17	16	17	18	17	17	18	20	17

Source: 11v11.com: 1993-94 Everton results
A = Away; H = Home; W = Win; D = Draw; L = Loss

== Results ==
Everton's score comes first

=== Legend ===
Win	Draw	Loss

=== FA Premier League ===
Date	Opponent	Venue	Result	Attendance	Scorers
14 August 1993	Southampton	A	2–0	14,051	Beagrie, Ebbrell
17 August 1993	Manchester City	H	1–0	26,036	Rideout
21 August 1993	Sheffield United	H	4–2	24,169	Ebbrell, Cottee (3)
25 August 1993	Newcastle United	A	0–1	34,833	
28 August 1993	Arsenal	A	0–2	29,063	
31 August 1993	Aston Villa	H	0–1	24,022	
11 September 1993	Oldham Athletic	A	1–0	13,666	Cottee
18 September 1993	Liverpool	H	2–0	38,157	Ward, Cottee
25 September 1993	Norwich City	H	1–5	20,531	Rideout
3 October 1993	Tottenham Hotspur	A	2–3	27,487	Cottee (pen), Rideout
16 October 1993	Swindon Town	A	1–1	14,414	Beagrie
23 October 1993	Manchester United	H	0–1	34,430	
30 October 1993	Ipswich Town	A	2–0	15,078	Barlow, Beagrie
6 November 1993	Coventry City	A	1–2	15,662	Rideout
20 November 1993	Queens Park Rangers	H	0–3	17,089	
23 November 1993	Leeds United	H	1–1	17,066	Cottee
27 November 1993	Wimbledon	A	1–1	6,934	Barlow
4 December 1993	Southampton	H	1–0	13,667	Cottee
8 December 1993	Manchester City	A	0–1	20,513	
11 December 1993	Sheffield United	A	0–0	15,135	
18 December 1993	Newcastle United	H	0–2	25,189	
27 December 1993	Sheffield Wednesday	H	0–2	16,777	
29 December 1993	Blackburn Rovers	A	0–2	21,462	
1 January 1994	West Ham United	H	0–1	19,579	
3 January 1994	Chelsea	A	2–4	18,338	Cottee, Barlow
15 January 1994	Swindon Town	H	6–2	20,546	Cottee (3), Ebbrell, Ablett, Beagrie
22 January 1994	Manchester United	A	0–1	44,750	
5 February 1994	Chelsea	H	4–2	18,821	Ebbrell, Angell, Rideout (2)
12 February 1994	Ipswich Town	H	0–0	19,588	
19 February 1994	Arsenal	H	1–1	19,891	Cottee
5 March 1994	Oldham Athletic	H	2–1	20,831	Preki, Stuart
13 March 1994	Liverpool	A	1–2	44,281	Watson
21 March 1994	Norwich City	A	0–3	16,432	
26 March 1994	Tottenham Hotspur	H	0–1	23,580	
30 March 1994	Aston Villa	A	0–0	36,044	
2 April 1994	Sheffield Wednesday	A	1–5	24,096	Cottee
4 April 1994	Blackburn Rovers	H	0–3	27,427	
9 April 1994	West Ham United	A	1–0	20,243	Cottee
16 April 1994	Queens Park Rangers	A	1–2	13,330	Cottee
23 April 1994	Coventry City	H	0–0	23,217	
30 April 1994	Leeds United	A	0–3	35,487	
7 May 1994	Wimbledon	H	3–2	31,297	Stuart (2, 1 pen), Horne

=== FA Cup ===
Round	Date	Opponent	Venue	Result	Attendance	Goalscorers
R3	8 January 1994	Bolton Wanderers	A	1–1	21,702	Rideout
R3R	19 January 1994	Bolton Wanderers	H	2–3 (a.e.t.)	34,642	Barlow (2)

=== League Cup ===
Round	Date	Opponent	Venue	Result	Attendance	Goalscorers
R2 1st leg	22 September 1993	Lincoln City	A	4–3	9,153	Rideout (3), Cottee
R2 2nd leg	6 October 1993	Lincoln City	H	4–2 (won 8–5 on agg)	8,375	Snodin, Rideout, Cottee (2)
R3	26 October 1993	Crystal Palace	H	2–2	11,547	Beagrie, Watson
R3R	16 November 1993	Crystal Palace	A	4–1	14,662	Young (own goal), Watson (2), Ward (pen)
R4	30 November 1993	Manchester United	H	0–2	34,052	

== Squad ==
Note: Flags indicate national team as defined under FIFA eligibility rules; some limited exceptions apply. Players may hold more than one non-FIFA nationality.

No.	Pos.	Nation	Player
1	GK	WAL	Neville Southall
2	DF	ENG	Matt Jackson
3	DF	ENG	Andy Hinchcliffe
4	MF	ENG	Ian Snodin
5	DF	ENG	Dave Watson (captain)
6	DF	ENG	Gary Ablett
8	MF	ENG	Graham Stuart
9	FW	ENG	Tony Cottee
10	MF	WAL	Barry Horne
12	DF	ENG	Paul Holmes
13	GK	AUS	Jason Kearton
14	MF	ENG	John Ebbrell
15	FW	ENG	Paul Rideout
16	MF	USA	Preki

No.	Pos.	Nation	Player
17	MF	SWE	Anders Limpar
18	MF	ENG	Joe Parkinson
19	FW	ENG	Stuart Barlow
20	MF	POL	Robert Warzycha
21	DF	ENG	Gary Rowett
22	FW	ENG	Brett Angell
23	MF	ENG	John Doolan
25	DF	ENG	Neil Moore
26	DF	ENG	David Unsworth
27	DF	ENG	Mark Powell
28	MF	ENG	Terry Jones
29	MF	ENG	Tony Grant
30	FW	ENG	Paul Tait
31	GK	ENG	Steve Reeves

=== Left the club during season ===
Note: Flags indicate national team as defined under FIFA eligibility rules; some limited exceptions apply. Players may hold more than one non-FIFA nationality.

No.	Pos.	Nation	Player
18	FW	SCO	Mo Johnston (to Hearts)
17	MF	ENG	Billy Kenny (to Oldham Athletic)

No.	Pos.	Nation	Player
7	MF	ENG	Mark Ward (to Birmingham City)
11	MF	ENG	Peter Beagrie (to Manchester City)
