= 1995–96 Everton F.C. season =

English football club season

Everton F.C.
1995–96 season
- Chairman: Peter Johnson
- Manager: Joe Royle
- Stadium: Goodison Park
- FA Premier League: 6th
- FA Cup: Fourth round
- League Cup: Second round
- FA Charity Shield: Winners
- UEFA Cup Winners' Cup: Second round
- Top goalscorer: League: Andrei Kanchelskis (16); All: Andrei Kanchelskis (16)
- Highest home attendance: 40,127 vs Aston Villa (5 May 1996, FA Premier League)
- Lowest home attendance: 14,891 vs Millwall (4 October 1995, League Cup)
- Average home league attendance: 35,435
Home colours	Away colours

During the 1995–96 English football season, Everton F.C. competed in the FA Premier League.

== Season summary ==
A season of goalscoring by Andrei Kanchelskis, Everton's dramatic signing from foes Manchester United following on from, the FA Cup Final victory last season, gave Everton fans a lot of fine moments as they finished 6th in the FA Premier League under manager Joe Royle, finishing just one place and two points short of a UEFA Cup place and winning the 1995 Charity Shield, 1–0 against Blackburn Rovers. However, Everton failed to make an impact either of the domestic cups or in their first European campaign in a decade. At the end of the season, Royle agreed a £3.5million fee with Leeds United, for midfielder Gary Speed.

== Final league table ==
Pos	Team	Pld	W	D	L	GF	GA	GD	Pts	Qualification or relegation
4	Aston Villa	38	18	9	11	52	35	+17	63	Qualification for the UEFA Cup first round
5	Arsenal	38	17	12	9	49	32	+17	63	Qualification for the UEFA Cup first round
6	Everton	38	17	10	11	64	44	+20	61	Excluded from the UEFA Cup (Note: The Football Association was initially awarded a UEFA Fair Play berth to the Premier League's highest-placed team not qualified for Europe, but was revoked by UEFA for its clubs fielding under-strength sides in the 1995 UEFA Intertoto Cup.)
7	Blackburn Rovers	38	18	7	13	61	47	+14	61	
8	Tottenham Hotspur	38	16	13	9	50	38	+12	61	

Source: Premier League
Rules for classification: 1) points; 2) goal difference; 3) number of goals scored.
Notes:

Results summary

Overall								Home						Away					
Pld	W	D	L	GF	GA	GD	Pts	W	D	L	GF	GA	GD	W	D	L	GF	GA	GD
38	17	10	11	64	44	+20	61	10	5	4	35	19	+16	7	5	7	29	25	+4

Source: Statto

Results by round

Round	1	2	3	4	5	6	7	8	9	10	11	12	13	14	15	16	17	18	19	20	21	22	23	24	25	26	27	28	29	30	31	32	33	34	35	36	37	38
Ground	A	H	H	A	H	A	A	H	A	H	A	H	A	H	H	A	H	A	A	H	H	A	H	A	A	H	A	H	A	H	A	H	A	H	A	H	A	H
Result	D	L	W	W	L	L	L	L	D	D	L	W	W	W	D	D	W	L	L	W	W	W	D	W	D	W	L	W	W	D	D	L	W	W	L	D	W	W
Position	10	16	10	7	9	12	14	14	14	15	16	13	13	11	12	12	11	12	12	12	11	9	10	9	9	8	8	7	6	7	6	7	7	6	7	7	6	6

Source: Statto.com
A = Away; H = Home; W = Win; D = Draw; L = Loss

== Results ==
Everton's score comes first

=== Legend ===
Win	Draw	Loss

=== FA Premier League ===
Date	Opponent	Venue	Result	Attendance	Scorers
19 August 1995	Chelsea	A	0–0	29,858	
23 August 1995	Arsenal	H	0–2	35,775	
26 August 1995	Southampton	H	2–0	33,668	Limpar, Amokachi
30 August 1995	Manchester City	A	2–0	28,432	Parkinson, Amokachi
9 September 1995	Manchester United	H	2–3	39,496	Limpar, Rideout
17 September 1995	Nottingham Forest	A	2–3	24,786	Rideout (2)
23 September 1995	West Ham United	A	1–2	21,085	Samways
1 October 1995	Newcastle United	H	1–3	33,080	Limpar
14 October 1995	Bolton Wanderers	A	1–1	20,427	Rideout
22 October 1995	Tottenham Hotspur	H	1–1	33,629	Stuart
28 October 1995	Aston Villa	A	0–1	32,792	
5 November 1995	Blackburn Rovers	H	1–0	30,097	Stuart
18 November 1995	Liverpool	A	2–1	40,818	Kanchelskis (2)
22 November 1995	Queens Park Rangers	H	2–0	30,009	Stuart, Rideout
25 November 1995	Sheffield Wednesday	H	2–2	35,898	Kanchelskis, Amokachi
2 December 1995	Tottenham Hotspur	A	0–0	32,894	
11 December 1995	West Ham United	H	3–0	31,778	Stuart, Unsworth (pen), Ebbrell
16 December 1995	Newcastle United	A	0–1	36,557	
23 December 1995	Coventry City	A	1–2	16,639	Rideout
26 December 1995	Middlesbrough	H	4–0	40,019	Short, Stuart (2), Kanchelskis
30 December 1995	Leeds United	H	2–0	40,009	Wetherall (own goal), Kanchelskis
1 January 1996	Wimbledon	A	3–2	11,121	Ebbrell, Ferguson (2)
13 January 1996	Chelsea	H	1–1	34,968	Unsworth (pen)
20 January 1996	Arsenal	A	2–1	38,275	Stuart, Kanchelskis
3 February 1996	Southampton	A	2–2	15,136	Stuart, Horne
10 February 1996	Manchester City	H	2–0	37,354	Parkinson, Hinchcliffe (pen)
21 February 1996	Manchester United	A	0–2	42,459	
24 February 1996	Nottingham Forest	H	3–0	33,163	Kanchelskis, Watson, Ferguson
2 March 1996	Middlesbrough	A	2–0	29,807	Grant, Hinchcliffe (pen)
9 March 1996	Coventry City	H	2–2	34,517	Ferguson (2)
17 March 1996	Leeds United	A	2–2	29,425	Stuart, Kanchelskis
23 March 1996	Wimbledon	H	2–4	31,382	Short, Kanchelskis
30 March 1996	Blackburn Rovers	A	3–0	29,468	Amokachi, Kanchelskis (2)
6 April 1996	Bolton Wanderers	H	3–0	37,974	Hottiger, Kanchelskis, Amokachi
8 April 1996	Queens Park Rangers	A	1–3	18,349	Ebbrell
16 April 1996	Liverpool	H	1–1	40,120	Kanchelskis
27 April 1996	Sheffield Wednesday	A	5–2	32,724	Amokachi, Ebbrell, Kanchelskis (3)
5 May 1996	Aston Villa	H	1–0	40,127	Parkinson

=== FA Charity Shield ===
Date	Opponent	Venue	Result	Attendance	Goalscorers
13 August 1995	Blackburn Rovers	N	1–0	40,149	Samways

=== FA Cup ===
Round	Date	Opponent	Venue	Result	Attendance	Goalscorers
R3	7 January 1996	Stockport County	H	2–2	28,921	Stuart, Ablett
R3R	17 January 1996	Stockport County	A	3–2	11,283	Ferguson, Stuart, Ebbrell
R4	27 January 1996	Port Vale	H	2–2	33,168	Amokachi, Ferguson
R4R	14 February 1996	Port Vale	A	1–2	19,197	Stuart

=== League Cup ===
Round	Date	Opponent	Venue	Result	Attendance	Goalscorers
R2 1st Leg	20 September 1995	Millwall	A	0–0	12,053	
R2 2nd Leg	4 October 1995	Millwall	H	2–4	14,891	Hinchcliffe (pen), Stuart

=== UEFA Cup Winners' Cup ===
Round	Date	Opponent	Venue	Result	Attendance	Goalscorers
R1 1st Leg	20 September 1995	KR Reykjavik	A	3–2	5,956	Ebbrell, Unsworth (pen), Amokachi
R1 2nd Leg	28 September 1995	KR Reykjavik	H	3–1 (won 6–3 on agg)	18,422	Grant, Rideout, Stuart
R2 1st Leg	19 October 1995	Feyenoord	H	0–0	27,526	
R2 2nd Leg	2 November 1995	Feyenoord	A	0–1 (lost 0–1 on agg)	40,289	

== Squad ==
Note: Flags indicate national team as defined under FIFA eligibility rules; some limited exceptions apply. Players may hold more than one non-FIFA nationality.

No.	Pos.	Nation	Player
1	GK	WAL	Neville Southall
2	DF	ENG	Earl Barrett
3	DF	ENG	Andy Hinchcliffe
4	DF	ENG	David Unsworth
5	DF	ENG	Dave Watson (captain)
6	DF	ENG	Gary Ablett
7	MF	ENG	Graham Stuart
8	FW	ENG	Paul Rideout
9	FW	SCO	Duncan Ferguson
10	MF	WAL	Barry Horne
11	MF	SWE	Anders Limpar
12	FW	NGA	Daniel Amokachi
13	GK	AUS	Jason Kearton
14	MF	ENG	John Ebbrell
15	DF	ENG	Matt Jackson
16	MF	ENG	Vinny Samways
17	MF	RUS	Andrei Kanchelskis

No.	Pos.	Nation	Player
18	MF	ENG	Joe Parkinson
19	DF	SUI	Marc Hottiger
20	FW	ENG	Tony Grant
21	DF	ENG	Craig Short
22	MF	ENG	Peter Holcroft
23	FW	ENG	Michael Branch
24	DF	ENG	Jon O'Connor
25	DF	ENG	Neil Moore
26	DF	ENG	Graham Allen
27	MF	ENG	Mark Grugel
28	MF	ENG	Chris Price
29	MF	ENG	Andrew Weathers
30	MF	ENG	Gerard Hennigan
32	DF	ENG	Chris Bull
33	GK	ENG	Jamie Speare
35	DF	ENG	John Hills

=== Left club during the season ===
Note: Flags indicate national team as defined under FIFA eligibility rules; some limited exceptions apply. Players may hold more than one non-FIFA nationality.

No.	Pos.	Nation	Player
19	FW	ENG	Stuart Barlow (to Oldham Athletic)
23	DF	ENG	Alex Smith (to Swindon Town)

No.	Pos.	Nation	Player
34	DF	ENG	Paul Holmes (to West Bromwich Albion)

=== Reserve squad ===
Note: Flags indicate national team as defined under FIFA eligibility rules; some limited exceptions apply. Players may hold more than one non-FIFA nationality.

No.	Pos.	Nation	Player
—	DF	IRL	Richard Dunne
—	MF	ENG	Gavin McCann

No.	Pos.	Nation	Player
—	FW	ENG	Mark Quayle

== Transfers ==
=== In ===
Date	Pos	Name	From	Fee
1 August 1995	DF	Craig Short	Derby County	£2,400,000
25 August 1995	MF	Andrei Kanchelskis	Manchester United	£5,000,000
3 November 1995	DF	John Hills	Blackpool	£90,000

=== Out ===
Date	Pos	Name	To	Fee
20 July 1995	DF	Gary Rowett	Derby County	£300,000
20 November 1995	FW	Stuart Barlow	Oldham Athletic	£350,000

Transfers in: ▼£7,490,000
Transfers out: ▲£650,000
Total spending: ▼£6,840,000
