= Billy Kenny =

Billy Kenny may refer to:

- Billy Kenny (footballer, born 1951), English footballer who played for Everton F.C. and Tranmere F.C.
- Billy Kenny (footballer, born 1973), English footballer who played for Everton F.C. and Oldham Athletic F.C.
- Billy Kenny (Australian footballer) (1871–1932), Australian rules footballer who played for South Melbourne
- Billy Kenny (artist), British producer, singer, songwriter

== See also ==
- Bill Kenny (disambiguation)
- William Kenny (disambiguation)
