= Bill Kenny =

Bill Kenny may refer to:

- Bill Kenny (English footballer), English soccer forward
- Bill Kenny (Australian footballer) (1897–1978), Australian rules footballer for South Melbourne
- Bill Kenny (singer) (1914–1978), African American singer, tenor with The Ink Spots
- Bill Kenny (hurler) (1899–1978), Irish hurler

== See also ==
- Bill Kenney (born 1955), American football player
- Bill Kenney (American football coach), American football coach at Western Michigan University
- Billy Kenny (disambiguation)
- William Kenny (disambiguation)
