= John Ebbrell =

English footballer (born 1969)

Personal information
- Full name: John Keith Ebbrell
- Date of birth: 1 October 1969 (age 57)
- Place of birth: Bromborough, Merseyside, England
- Height: 5 ft 7 in (1.70 m)
- Position: Midfielder

Senior career*
Years	Team	Apps	(Gls)
1986–1997	Everton	207	(13)
1997–1999	Sheffield United	1	(0)
Total		208	(13)
- * Club domestic league appearances and goals

John Keith Ebbrell (born 1 October 1969) is an English football coach and former professional footballer who was most recently Assistant Manager at Oldham Athletic F.C.

As a player he was a midfielder who played 207 times in the league for Everton between 1986 and 1997, playing numerous seasons in the Premier League and being part of the team that won the FA Cup in 1995. He played for Sheffield United in the Football League but an ankle injury limited him to one appearance over two years and would later lead to his retirement.

He returned to Everton initially as a scout but would join Tranmere Rovers as a youth team coach and later, manager of their centre of excellence. He returned to the Toffees in 2015 and held a variety of different roles.

== Playing career ==
=== Everton ===
Ebbrell signed schoolboy forms for Everton aged 12. Everton proposed Ebbrell attend trials for the first intake of the FA/GM National Football School at Lilleshall in 1984. The trials were successful, and he went on to captain the England schoolboys' teams at various age levels. Shortly after graduating he signed professional forms for Everton in 1986 and was quickly fast-tracked by Howard Kendall to regularly train with the first team squad, resulting in an early first team call-up and then becoming a regular first team player in the early 1990s. During a difficult decade for the Toffees, Ebbrell was part of the Everton squad that reached the 1995 FA Cup final starting 3 of the 6 matches, but after missing the semi-final (in which Everton comfortably beat an impressive Tottenham Hotspur) through suspension, manager Joe Royle continued with the other two-thirds of the Dogs of War for the final – Barry Horne and Joe Parkinson, and strikers Duncan Ferguson and Daniel Amokachi were chosen to be the outfield subs ahead of Ebbrell.

=== Sheffield United ===
In 1997 Howard Kendall, then manager of Sheffield United, bought Ebbrell in a £1.2m transfer deal.

Ebbrell's career at Sheffield United was blighted by an ankle injury, originally sustained at Everton but deteriorated after surgery during his time at Sheffield United, to the extent that Ebbrell was forced to retire from professional football early in 1999. He made his Sheffield United debut against Reading, but was replaced by Don Hutchison at half time, meaning he only completed 45 minutes of action in his Sheffield United career.

Everton hosted a testimonial match in which Joe Royle provided the opposition, in the form of Manchester City, as recognition of Ebbrell's service extending to more than 10 years of top flight football with Everton.

== Coaching career ==
Ebbrell's first post-playing football role was as Chief Scout under David Moyes at Everton, a post Ebbrell held for 3 years before subsequently leaving to pursue a football agency role. Ebbrell co-founded X8 Ltd, a football representation and agency business. In 2002, X8 merged with Proform Sports Management Ltd. The combined agency represented approximately 60 players (including a young Wayne Rooney). Ebbrell resumed his football career when he started coaching at Tranmere Rovers in the 2008–09 season.

In July 2010 Ebbrell succeeded Kenny Shiels as Tranmere Rovers' Centre of Excellence Manager.

In March 2015 Ebbrell re-joined Everton in an Academy Coaching role.

In January 2016 Ebbrell took charge of Everton's Under-18 side as Manager.

Ebbrell was appointed Assistant Manager of Everton u23's team for the 2016–17 season, winning the Premier League 2 Division One title in its first season in u23 format. Everton u23s won the Premier League 2 Division One title for the second time in three seasons in April 2019.

Ebbrell was promoted to the position of Head of Academy Coaching and Under-23s Assistant Manager in November 2020, with responsibility for overseeing the Academy Coaching programme, whilst continuing his role as assistant to Academy Director and Under-23s manager David Unsworth. Earlier this year, he was appointed to the role of "Academy Player Senior Development Coach" following the departure of Unsworth and the appointment of Paul Tait as the side's under-21 manager.

In October 2022, he was appointed Assistant Manager under David Unsworth at Oldham Athletic A.F.C.

=== Playing career statistics ===
Season	League Apps (sub)	League Goals	Cup Apps (sub)	Cup Goals	Total Apps (Sub)	Total Goals
1986–87	– (-)	–	– (1)	–	– (1)	–
1987–88	– (-)	–	– (-)	–	– (-)	–
1988–89	1 (3)	–	– (1)	–	1 (4)	–
1989–90	13 (4)	–	4 (-)	–	17 (4)	–
1990–91	34 (2)	3	14 (-)	4	48 (2)	7
1991–92	39 (-)	1	7 (-)	–	46 (-)	1
1992–93	24 (-)	1	4 (-)	–	28 (-)	1
1993–94	39 (-)	4	6 (-)	–	45 (-)	4
1994–95	26 (-)	–	3 (-)	–	29 (-)	–
1995–96	24 (1)	4	7 (-)	2	31 (-)	6
1996–97	7 (-)	–	1 (-)	–	8 (-)	–
Career	207 (10)	13	16 (2)	6	253 (12)	19
