= William Kenny =

William Kenny may refer to:

- William Kenny (Irish politician) (1846–1921), Irish lawyer, judge and politician
- William Kenny (VC) (1880–1936), recipient of the Victoria Cross
- William David Kenny (1889–?), Irish recipient of the Victoria Cross
- William Kenny (New Zealand politician) (1811–1880), member of the New Zealand Legislative Council
- William John Kenny (1853–1913), American Roman Catholic bishop
- Ernie Kenny (William Ernest Kenny), ice hockey player
- William Stopford Kenny (1788–1867), British writer on chess and educational subjects

== See also ==
- Billy Kenny (disambiguation)
- Bill Kenny (disambiguation)
