= 1995 FA Cup final =

English association football match

1995 FA Cup Final
- Event: 1994–95 FA Cup
Everton	Manchester United
1	0
- Date: 20 May 1995
- Venue: Wembley Stadium, London
- Man of the Match: Dave Watson (Everton)
- Referee: Gerald Ashby (Worcestershire)
- Attendance: 79,592

The 1995 FA Cup final was a football match played at Wembley Stadium in London on 20 May 1995 to determine the winner of the 1994–95 FA Cup. The 50th FA Cup Final to be played at Wembley since the Second World War, it was contested by Everton and Manchester United. Everton won the match 1–0 via a headed goal by Paul Rideout, after Graham Stuart's shot rebounded off the crossbar. The rest of the game saw Manchester United dominating the attack, only for Welsh international goalkeeper Neville Southall to hold on to a clean sheet.

== Summary ==
Manchester United, double-winners the previous season, had lost their league crown the previous Sunday to Blackburn Rovers. Manchester United had to play the final without three of their most important players: Eric Cantona (suspended), Andrei Kanchelskis (injured) and Andy Cole (cup-tied). Between them, those three had scored 41 goals in all competitions for United during the season, plus another 15 Cole scored for Newcastle. The final saw final Manchester United appearances for Paul Ince and Mark Hughes (who had contributed greatly to Manchester United's successes under the management of Alex Ferguson), as they both moved to new clubs within weeks after the final. However, the game saw some promising performances from breakthrough players Gary Neville, Nicky Butt and Paul Scholes, all of whom would go on to win numerous major honours for the club.

Everton, meanwhile, had escaped from a relegation dogfight which had seen them make their worst start to a league campaign (eight points from a possible 42 after 14 games), with a superbly successful cup run which saw them reach Wembley having conceded only one goal (a penalty for Jürgen Klinsmann of Tottenham Hotspur in the semi-final, which Everton won 4–1). Everton's only absentee was defender Earl Barrett who was cup-tied, and had therefore not been part of Everton's FA cup campaign. Duncan Ferguson passed a fitness test on the day of the game, however, Ferguson was only given a place on the substitutes bench, with Everton fielding the same starting XI that defeated Tottenham Hotspur in the FA Cup semi-final. There was no place among the substitutes for homegrown boyhood Blue John Ebbrell, with Daniel Amokachi being preferred on the bench after he scored twice in the semi-final. Stuart Barlow and Vinny Samways were the other players from the original 17-man cup final squad to not make the 14-man matchday squad. Ebbrell, Barlow and Samways all missed the semi-final against Spurs due to injury, allowing Amokachi to take a place on the substitutes bench; he then scored two goals after mistakenly coming on for Paul Rideout. Rideout had been a doubt for the game with a knee ligament injury and appeared to have suffered a recurrence midway through the second half; after receiving treatment from the Everton physio, Rideout indicated he was ready to return to action, but Amokachi misinterpreted his signal and entered the field, with the substitution confirmed by the fourth official.

It was Everton's first major trophy since they won the league championship eight years earlier, and is their most recent major trophy to date. In contrast, Manchester United were left without a major trophy for the first time since the 1988–89 season and were denied the opportunity to become the first club to win the FA Cup nine times.

This was the last time that an English manager won the FA Cup – as well as the last time a club other than Arsenal, Chelsea, Liverpool or Manchester United won the FA Cup – until 2008, when Harry Redknapp managed Portsmouth to victory.

The trophy was presented to the Everton captain and man of the match Dave Watson by the Prince of Wales (now Charles III), whose sons Princes William and Harry were attending their first FA Cup Final.

== Road to Wembley ==
=== Everton ===
Home teams listed first. Round 3: Everton 1–0 Derby County

Round 4: Bristol City 0–1 Everton

Round 5: Everton 5–0 Norwich City

Round 6: Everton 1–0 Newcastle United

Semi-final: Everton 4–1 Tottenham Hotspur (at Elland Road, Leeds)

=== Manchester United ===
Home teams listed first. Round 3: Sheffield United 0–2 Manchester United

Round 4: Manchester United 5–2 Wrexham

Round 5: Manchester United 3–1 Leeds United

Round 6: Manchester United 2–0 Queens Park Rangers

Semi-final Manchester United 2–2 Crystal Palace (at Villa Park, Birmingham)

(replay) Manchester United 2–0 Crystal Palace (at Villa Park)

== Match details ==
20 May 1995
15:00 BST

Everton	1–0	Manchester United
Rideout 30'	Report

Wembley Stadium, London
Attendance: 79,592
Referee: Gerald Ashby (Worcestershire)

Everton	Manchester United

GK	1	(Wales) Neville Southall
CB	6	(England) Gary Ablett
CB	5	(England) Dave Watson (c)
CB	2	(England) Matt Jackson
RM	8	(England) Graham Stuart
CM	18	(England) Joe Parkinson
CM	10	(Wales) Barry Horne
LM	26	(England) David Unsworth
RF	17	(Sweden) Anders Limpar	(substituted off) 69'
CF	15	(England) Paul Rideout	(substituted off) 51'
LF	3	(England) Andy Hinchcliffe
Substitutes:
GK	13	(Australia) Jason Kearton
FW	9	(Scotland) Duncan Ferguson	(substituted on) 51'
FW	11	(Nigeria) Daniel Amokachi	(substituted on) 69'
Manager:
(England) Joe Royle

GK	1	(Denmark) Peter Schmeichel
RB	27	(England) Gary Neville
CB	4	(England) Steve Bruce (c)	(substituted off) 46'
CB	6	(England) Gary Pallister
LB	3	(Republic of Ireland) Denis Irwin
RM	16	(Republic of Ireland) Roy Keane
CM	19	(England) Nicky Butt
CM	8	(England) Paul Ince
LM	5	(England) Lee Sharpe	(substituted off) 72'
CF	9	(Scotland) Brian McClair
ST	10	(Wales) Mark Hughes
Substitutes:
GK	13	(England) Gary Walsh
MF	11	(Wales) Ryan Giggs	(substituted on) 46'
MF	24	(England) Paul Scholes	(substituted on) 72'
Manager:
(Scotland) Alex Ferguson

Man of the match

- (England) Dave Watson (Everton)

Match officials

- Assistant referees:
  - Steve Bennett (Kent)
  - Mark Warren (Birmingham)
- Fourth official: Steve Lodge (South Yorkshire)

Match rules

- 90 minutes
- 30 minutes of extra time if necessary
- Replay if scores still level
- Three named substitutes, of which two may be used

== See also ==
- All Together Now (Everton song)
- We're Gonna Do It Again (Manchester United song)
