= 1995 FA Charity Shield =

- The match programme cover
Blackburn Rovers	Everton
0	1
- Date: 13 August 1995
- Venue: Wembley Stadium, London
- Man of the Match: Earl Barrett
- Referee: Dermot Gallagher (Oxfordshire)
- Attendance: 40,149

The 1995 FA Charity Shield (also known as the Littlewoods Pools FA Charity Shield for sponsorship reasons) was the 73rd FA Charity Shield, an annual football match played between the winners of the previous season's Premier League and FA Cup competitions. The match was played on 13 August 1995 at Wembley Stadium and contested by Blackburn Rovers, who had won the Premier League and FA Cup winners Everton. It was Blackburn's second successive Charity Shield appearance, while Everton were appearing in their eleventh and their first since 1987.

Everton won the match 1–0 with a goal from Vinny Samways when he caught Tim Flowers off his line and lifted the ball over him from the left of the penalty area and into the right corner of the net. As of 2026, this was the most recent Shield appearance for both teams.

== Match details ==
13 August 1995
16:00

Blackburn Rovers	0–1	Everton
	Report	Samways 57'

Wembley Stadium, London
Attendance: 40,149
Referee: Dermot Gallagher (Oxfordshire)

Blackburn Rovers	Everton

GK	1	(England) Tim Flowers
RB	3	(Republic of Ireland) Jeff Kenna	(substituted off) 31'
CB	25	(England) Ian Pearce
CB	16	(England) Chris Sutton
LB	6	(England) Graeme Le Saux
RM	7	(England) Stuart Ripley	(substituted off) 68'
CM	23	(England) David Batty
CM	4	(England) Tim Sherwood (c)
LM	8	(Scotland) Kevin Gallacher	(substituted off) 80'
CF	10	(England) Mike Newell
CF	9	(England) Alan Shearer
Substitutes:
GK	13	(England) Bobby Mimms
DF	12	(England) Nicky Marker	(substituted on) 80'
MF	26	(Republic of Ireland) Gary Tallon
MF	14	(England) Lee Makel	(substituted on) 68'
MF	22	(England) Mark Atkins	(substituted on) 31'
Manager:
(England) Ray Harford

GK	1	(Wales) Neville Southall
RB	2	(England) Earl Barrett
CB	6	(England) Gary Ablett
CB	20	(England) Tony Grant	(substituted off) 46'
LB	4	(England) David Unsworth
CM	18	(England) Joe Parkinson
CM	16	(England) Vinny Samways
CM	10	(Wales) Barry Horne (c)
RF	11	(Sweden) Anders Limpar
CF	8	(England) Paul Rideout
LF	3	(England) Andy Hinchcliffe
Substitutes:
GK	13	(Australia) Jason Kearton
DF	5	(England) Dave Watson	(substituted on) 46'
DF	15	(England) Matt Jackson
MF	14	(England) John Ebbrell
FW	12	(Nigeria) Daniel Amokachi
Manager:
(England) Joe Royle

Match rules

- 90 minutes
- Penalty shootout if scores level
- Five named substitutes
- Maximum of three substitutions

== See also ==
- 1994–95 FA Premier League
- 1994–95 FA Cup
