= The Barry Horns =

British brass band

The Barry Horns are an eleven-piece brass band, made up of fans of the Welsh national football team. The band's name is a homage to retired Welsh footballer Barry Horne. The band has a five-point mission statement called the Barryfesto, which notes that the band exists in order

1. to unite Welsh football with the power of horns
2. to put tunes on the terraces
3. to bring hope where there is mathematical impossibility
4. to replace plastic hooters with brass ones
5. to win at life when we can't win at football.

Musically the band play a variety of songs, many of which are associated with Wales and/or football, including "Can't Take My Eyes Off You", "Just Can't Get Enough" and "Zombie Nation".

The Barry Horns' first public appearance was outside the Wales v England World Cup Qualifying match in Cardiff on 26 March 2011. They also appeared at the Welsh Cup Final in the same year, which was broadcast on S4C.

Their other media appearances include performing on BBC1's flagship football programme Football Focus, BBC Radio 5 Live and in a short promotional campaign for BBC Wales' coverage of Welsh national football. In December 2011, they were the house band on the Jamie and Louise programme on BBC Radio Wales, playing a variety of Christmas related songs including an interpretation of East 17's 'Stay Another Day'.

In February 2012, The Barry Horns released a video for their version of the Rocky theme, which they recorded as the anthem for Wales's World Cup 2014 qualifying campaign. The video featured members of the band in various training scenarios as a parody of the training montage from the film.

In December 2013, the band released a cover of the song "Only You", 30 years after the cover by The Flying Pickets had earned a Christmas Number 1. The recording failed to make the UK charts but proceeds were donated to the charity Prostate Cymru, with a dedication made to the Flying Pickets' lead vocalist, Brian Hibbard, who died of prostate cancer in 2012. A music video released on YouTube paid homage to the original Pickets video from 1983.

In June 2016, the band released "This is Wales" to coincide with their support of Welsh football team's Euro 2016 finals campaign. The tournament also saw a popular reworking of “Push It” by Salt 'n Pepa, with new lyrics pertaining to the footballer, Hal Robson-Kanu. On the evening of Wales' semi-final defeat to eventual tournament winners, Portugal, The Barry Horns played on the BBC Six O Clock news, outside the Elephant & Castle pub in Lyon.

In March 2017, the band was controversially banned by the FAI from the Republic of Ireland vs. Wales World Cup 2018 qualifying match in Dublin. In September that same year, The Barry Horns gave a headline performance at the first Welsh Independence music festival in association with Yes Cymru, held at Clwb Ifor Bach in Cardiff.

In November 2019, the band's Twitter account operated by 'The Man From Uncle' was controversially closed down. Following a degree of public outcry, the account was reinstated by Twitter in December the same year.

In July 2021, the band released the bilingual single 'Cymru Rydd' to coincide with the delayed EURO 2020 Championships. The single included a sample of Michael Sheen taken from the Raymond Williams lecture series of 2017. The Barry Horns performed an instrumental-only version of 'Cymru Rydd' on S4C's Y Wal Goch as the lyrics were censored by the station for political reasons. This occurrence prompted Welsh folk singer, Dafydd Iwan, to write an article in the periodical, Barn, defending freedom of creative expression on Welsh language television.
