= Anders Limpar =

Swedish footballer (born 1965)

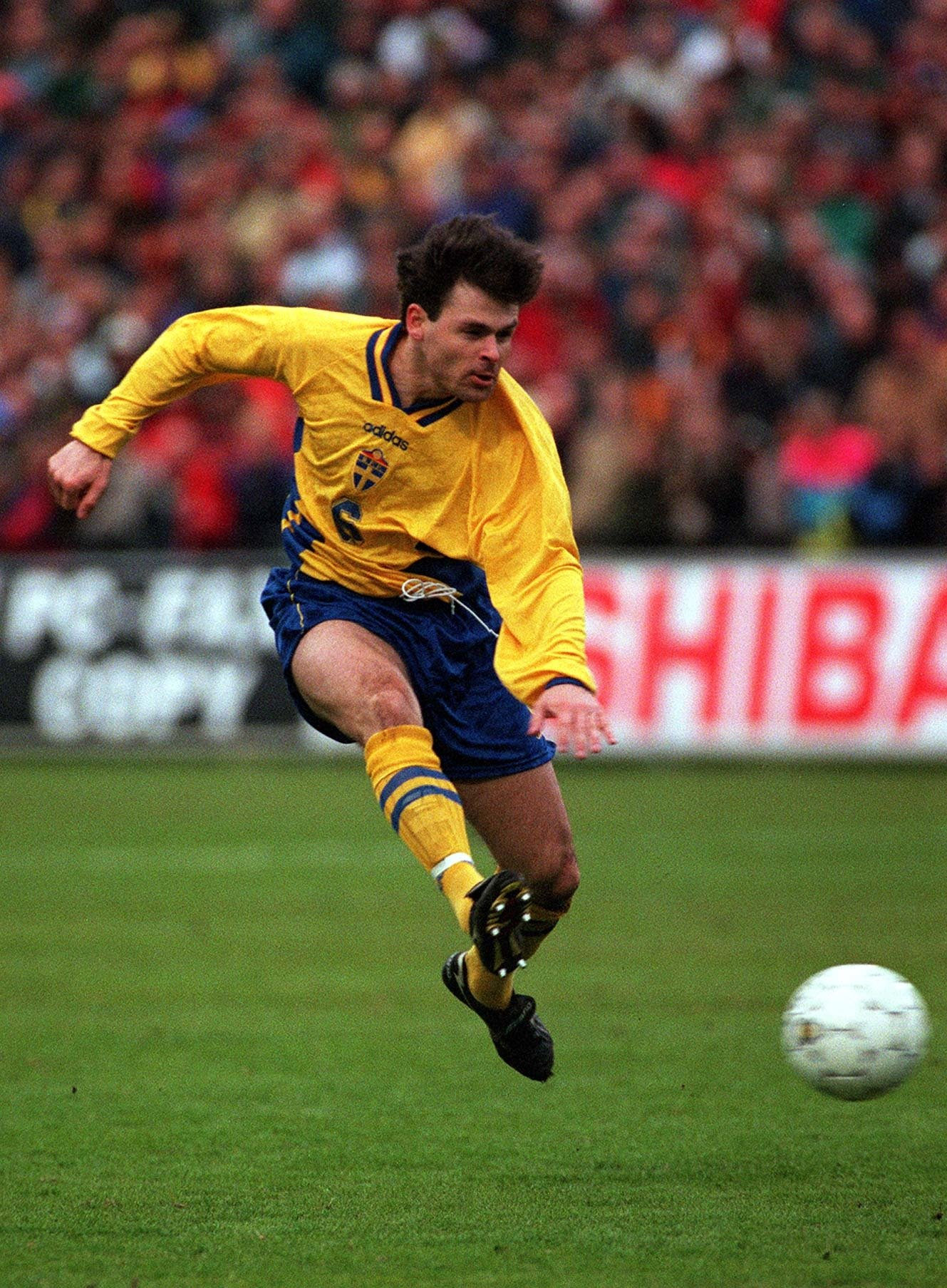
- Limpar playing for the Sweden national team

Personal information
- Full name: Anders Erik Limpár
- Date of birth: 24 September 1965 (age 61)
- Place of birth: Solna, Sweden
- Height: 1.72 m (5 ft 8 in)
- Position: Midfielder

Senior career*
| Years | Team | Apps | (Gls) |
| 1981–1986 | Brommapojkarna | 77 | (20) |
| 1986–1988 | Örgryte | 47 | (9) |
| 1988–1989 | Young Boys | 27 | (7) |
| 1989–1990 | Cremonese | 24 | (3) |
| 1990–1994 | Arsenal | 96 | (17) |
| 1994–1997 | Everton | 67 | (5) |
| 1997 | Birmingham City | 4 | (0) |
| 1998–1999 | AIK | 22 | (2) |
| 1999–2000 | Colorado Rapids | 36 | (3) |
| 2000 | Djurgården | 0 | (0) |
| 2001–2002 | Brommapojkarna | 19 | (3) |
| Total | | 419 | (69) |

International career
| 1981–1982 | Sweden U17 | 6 | (3) |
| 1983–1984 | Sweden U19 | 22 | (6) |
| 1984–1988 | Sweden U21/O | 30 | (4) |
| 1987–1996 | Sweden | 58 | (6) |
Medal record
Sweden
FIFA World Cup
| Bronze medal – third place | 1994 |
- * Club domestic league appearances and goals

Anders Erik Limpár (Swedish pronunciation: [ˈanːdɛʂ ˈlɪmˌpɑːr]; born 24 September 1965) is a Swedish former professional footballer who played as a midfielder.

Limpar featured for the clubs IF Brommapojkarna, Young Boys, Cremonese, Arsenal, Everton, Birmingham City, AIK, Colorado Rapids and Djurgårdens IF during a career that spanned between 1981 and 2002.

A full international between 1987 and 1996, Limpar was capped 58 times by Sweden, scoring 6 goals altogether. He represented Sweden at the 1988 Summer Olympics, the 1990 FIFA World Cup, UEFA Euro 1992, as well as the 1994 FIFA World Cup where Sweden finished third.

In 1991, he was awarded Guldbollen as Sweden's best footballer of the year.

== Club career ==
=== Early career ===
Born in Solna with Hungarian roots, Limpar started playing football in Brommapojkarna, famous for its production of footballing talent. He then played for Örgryte, joining in the wake of its sensational Swedish championship title in 1985. Limpar quickly became one of the hottest properties in Swedish football, and as so he was offered the chance to journey to Switzerland with Bern club Young Boys. He followed this up in a one-season spell in Italy with Cremonese during the 1989–90 season. That season Limpar was named Serie A's third best foreign player behind Diego Maradona and Lothar Matthäus.

=== Arsenal ===
His club career peaked when he signed for Arsenal on 8 July 1990 from Cremonese for £1m. Limpar quickly impressed in the Makita Tournament at Wembley and made his League debut in the 3–0 win at Wimbledon 25 August 1990. He went on to win the league title in the 1990–91 season. Limpar was also involved in the brawl against Manchester United 20 October 1990 and scored the only goal of the game. He played a particularly notable part in the 1990–91 season, scoring some important goals, and impressing in his first season with exciting wing play and crowd-pleasing displays. These included a hat-trick against Coventry City in a 6–1 win on the final day of the league season, by which time Arsenal were already champions. He managed a total of 13 goals that season, with 11 of them coming in the league.

He won the Guldbollen – Sweden's Player of the Year award – in 1991.

In the season 1991–92, Limpar was in and out of the side. A jaw injury kept him out for several weeks but he still netted some spectacular goals including a 40 yard chip in Arsenals 4–0 win over Liverpool on 20 April 1992. A succession of knocks hampered him the following season, and he sat on the sidelines injured for Arsenal's 1993 wins in both the League and the FA Cups. He and manager George Graham eventually fell out and with his contract due to come to an end in May 1994, Limpar, who was seeking a new deal at the club, was not offered one by Graham. Limpar played his last match with Arsenal against Southampton 19 March 1994. Limpar scored 20 goals from 116 appearances for Arsenal where he was popular with the fans, particularly for his performances in the title winning season.

=== Everton ===
On transfer deadline day in March 1994, Limpar transferred to Everton for £1.6 million. Limpar has revealed how he told reporters on the day he signed for Arsenal 1990, that he supported Everton.

He made his debut for Everton in a home defeat (1–0 to Tottenham Hotspur) on 26 March 1994. Limpar won a crucial penalty for Everton in the final day victory over Wimbledon in 1994, which preserved Everton's Premiership status.

Whilst playing for the Toffees he won the FA Cup for the first time in 1995. Limpar went on to play a vital role in the Cup final at Wembley, with a run from inside his own half leading to Everton's winning goal being scored by Paul Rideout. He also hit a memorable 50-yard reverse-pass which led to an Everton break-away that BBC commentator Barry Davies described as the 'pass of the match'. He also won the 1995 FA Charity Shield with Everton, but eventually fell out of favour at Goodison Park after 1995–96, making only two appearances for the club during the 1996–97 season.

=== Birmingham City ===
On 20 January 1997, Limpar was signed by Birmingham City for a fee of £100,000. He made his league debut on 1 February 1997, in a 2–1 away defeat against Bolton Wanderers. The move proved to be unfruitful, as he made only four appearances, before the club later ended his stay in April 1997.

=== Later career ===
Moving back to Sweden on a free transfer to AIK in the summer of 1997, he won the Allsvenskan title in 1998. After two years in Stockholm, he signed for Major League Soccer side Colorado Rapids in February 1999 where he stayed until November 2000. He then returned to Sweden to sign for Djurgårdens IF. However he failed to make an appearance for them and shortly went on to IF Brommapojkarna, where he started his club career. He eventually retired from the game in March 2001 at the age of 35, due to persistent injuries.

At the age of 56 Anders made a comeback for Hede IK in the Swedish Division 5 and scored a goal from half the football field.

== International career ==
In total, Limpar won 58 caps for Sweden, scoring 6 goals between 1987 and 1996. He was a member of one of the most successful Sweden squads ever, the team that finished third at the 1994 FIFA World Cup in the United States. Limpar was assumed to be a starting player for Sweden before the tournament, but manager Tommy Svensson preferred the more defensive-minded Jesper Blomqvist in the opening game against Cameroon, and later moved Tomas Brolin into Limpar’s preferred left wing position. Limpar did not play a large role during the tournament, making just one substitute appearance, in the 3rd-place match. He also represented Sweden at the 1988 Summer Olympics, 1990 FIFA World Cup, and UEFA Euro 1992.

== Coaching career ==
Limpar began coaching the youth team at Djurgårdens IF. He was later appointed assistant manager for the Swedish second division team Sollentuna United. In October 2008, aged 43, he played a one-off game for Sollentuna United's reserve side in the position of left back.

== Personal life ==
After retiring from football in 2001, Limpar opened a bar, The Limp Bar, in central Stockholm, although it has since closed. In 2012 Limpar, together with colleague Mikael Crona, founded Swedish company Super Lock which produces plastic boxes. He currently is the CEO of betting site BestBetToday.com.

== Career statistics ==
=== International ===
Appearances and goals by national team and year
| National team | Year | Apps | Goals |
|---|---|---|---|
| Sweden | 1987 | 8 | 1 |
| Sweden | 1988 | 4 | 0 |
| Sweden | 1989 | 6 | 0 |
| Sweden | 1990 | 6 | 1 |
| Sweden | 1991 | 5 | 2 |
| Sweden | 1992 | 10 | 1 |
| Sweden | 1993 | 5 | 0 |
| Sweden | 1994 | 8 | 0 |
| Sweden | 1995 | 1 | 0 |
| Sweden | 1996 | 5 | 1 |
| Total | | 58 | 6 |

Scores and results list Sweden's goal tally first, score column indicates score after each Limpar goal.

List of international goals scored by Anders Limpar
| No. | Date | Venue | Opponent | Score | Result | Competition | Ref. |
|---|---|---|---|---|---|---|---|
| 1 | 18 April 1987 | Central Dynamo Stadium, Moscow, Soviet Union | Soviet Union | 1–0 | 3–1 | Friendly | |
| 2 | 27 June 1990 | Råsunda Stadium, Solna, Sweden | Finland | 2–0 | 6–0 | Friendly | |
| 3 | 8 August 1991 | Ullevaal Stadium, Oslo, Norway | Norway | 2–1 | 2–1 | Friendly | |
| 4 | 4 September 1991 | Råsunda Stadium, Solna, Sweden | Yugoslavia | 2–1 | 4–3 | Friendly | |
| 5 | 11 November 1992 | Ramat Gan Stadium, Ramat Gan, Israel | Israel | 1–0 | 3–1 | 1994 FIFA World Cup qualifier | |
| 6 | 16 May 1996 | Seoul Olympic Stadium, Seoul, South Korea | South Korea | 2–0 | 2–0 | Friendly | |

== Honours ==
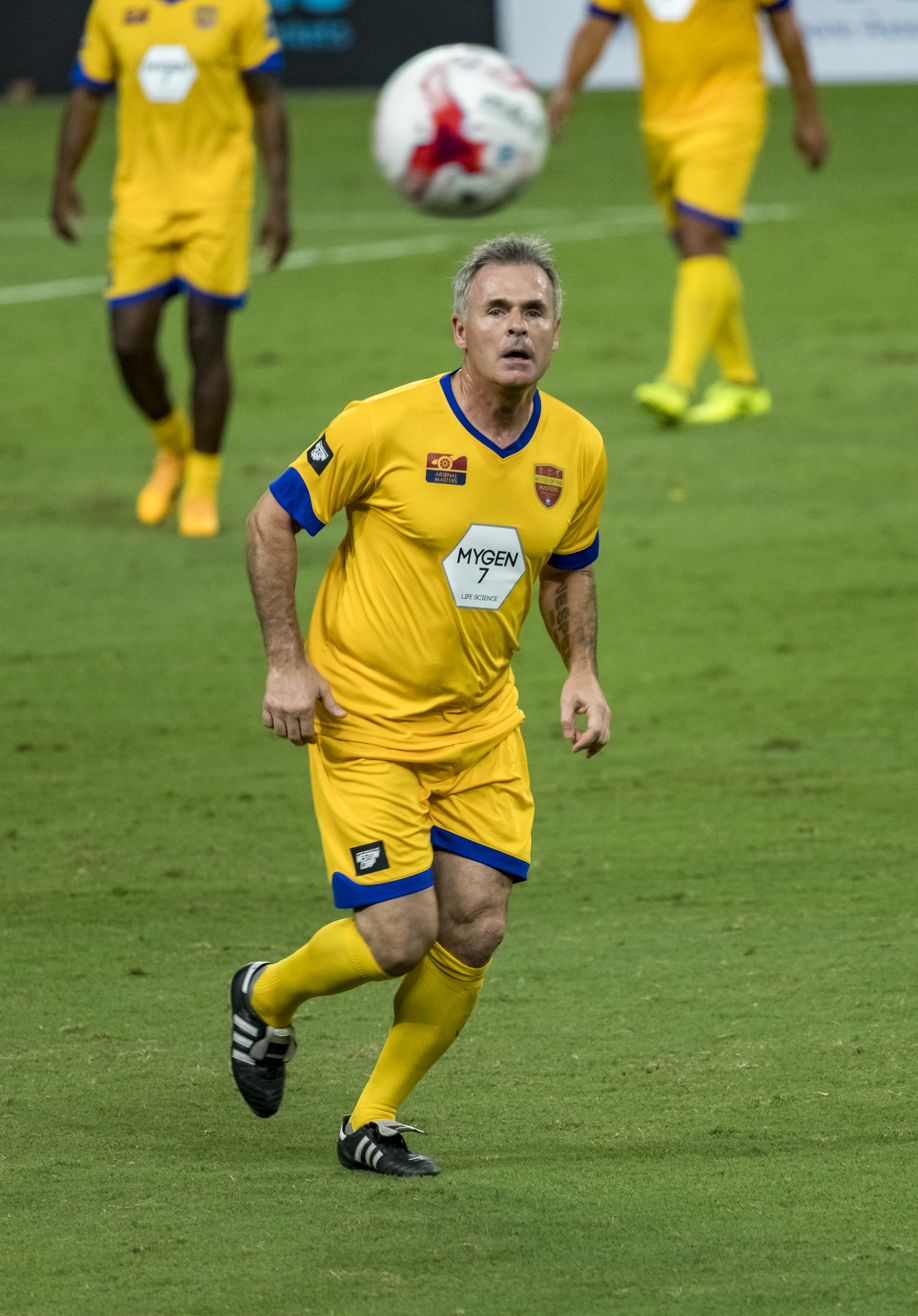
Limpar in 2017

Arsenal

- Football League First Division: 1990–91

Everton

- FA Cup: 1994–95
- FA Charity Shield: 1995

AIK

- Allsvenskan: 1998
- Svenska Cupen: 1998–99

Sweden

- FIFA World Cup third place: 1994

Individual

- Guldbollen: 1991
- IF Brommapojkarna Hall of Fame: 2014
