= 1987–88 Portsmouth F.C. season =

Portsmouth F.C.
1987–88 season
- Chairman: John Deacon
- Manager: Alan Ball
- Stadium: Fratton Park
- First Division: 19th (relegated)
- FA Cup: Quarter-finals
- League Cup: Second round
- Full Members Cup: First round
- Top goalscorer: League: ? All: Micky Quinn (11)

During the 1987–88 English football season, Portsmouth F.C. competed in the Football League First Division, following promotion from the Second Division the previous season.

== Kit ==
Admiral became Portsmouth's kit manufacturers for the season. For the first time in their history Portsmouth's kits wore sponsorship, South Coast Fiat (a Fiat dealership chain in the local area) sponsoring the kit.

== Squad ==
Squad at end of season

Note: Flags indicate national team as defined under FIFA eligibility rules; some limited exceptions apply. Players may hold more than one non-FIFA nationality.

Pos.	Nation	Player
GK	ENG	Andy Gosney
GK	ENG	Alan Knight
GK	ENG	Paul Musselwhite
DF	ENG	Billy Gilbert
DF	ENG	Paul Hardyman
DF	ENG	Lee Sandford
DF	ENG	Kenny Swain
DF	IRL	Liam Daish
DF	JAM	Noel Blake
MF	ENG	Kevin Ball
MF	ENG	Kevin Dillon

Pos.	Nation	Player
MF	ENG	Mike Fillery
MF	ENG	Vince Hilaire
MF	ENG	Clive Whitehead
MF	WAL	Barry Horne
MF	IRL	Mark Kelly
MF	USA	John Kerr
FW	ENG	Paul Mariner
FW	ENG	Micky Quinn
FW	ENG	Terry Connor
FW	NIR	Ian Stewart
		Lee Darby
		Andy Perry

=== Left club during season ===
Note: Flags indicate national team as defined under FIFA eligibility rules; some limited exceptions apply. Players may hold more than one non-FIFA nationality.

Pos.	Nation	Player
DF	ENG	Malcolm Shotton (to Huddersfield Town)
DF	ENG	Kenny Swain (on loan to West Bromwich Albion)
MF	IRL	Mick Kennedy (to Bradford City)

Pos.	Nation	Player
MF	USA	John Kerr (on loan to Peterborough United)
FW	ENG	Ian Baird (to Leeds United)

=== Reserves ===
Note: Flags indicate national team as defined under FIFA eligibility rules; some limited exceptions apply. Players may hold more than one non-FIFA nationality.

Pos.	Nation	Player
DF	WAL	Kit Symons

== Transfers ==
=== In ===
- (Wales) Barry Horne - (Wales) Wrexham, £60,000, 17 July 1987
- (England) Ian Baird - (England) Leeds United, £285,000, 12 August 1987
- (United States) John Kerr - (England) Harrow Borough
- (Northern Ireland) Ian Stewart - (England) Newcastle United

=== Out ===
- (England) Brett Angell - released (later joined Cheltenham Town)
- (Republic of Ireland) Mick Kennedy - (England) Bradford City
- (England) Ian Baird - (England) Leeds United, £120,000, March 1988
- (England) Kenny Swain - (England) West Bromwich Albion, loan
- (United States) John Kerr - (England) Peterborough United, loan

== Results ==
=== First Division ===
Pos	Team	Pld	W	D	L	GF	GA	GD	Pts	Qualification or relegation
17	Charlton Athletic	40	9	15	16	38	52	−14	42	
18	Chelsea (R)	40	9	15	16	50	68	−18	42	Qualified for Second Division play-offs
19	Portsmouth (R)	40	7	14	19	36	66	−30	35	Relegated to Second Division
20	Watford (R)	40	7	11	22	27	51	−24	32	Relegated to Second Division
21	Oxford United (R)	40	6	13	21	44	80	−36	31	Relegated to Second Division

Source: World Football
Rules for classification: 1) Points; 2) Goal difference; 3) Goals scored
(R) Relegated
- 22 August 1987 Portsmouth 2-2 Southampton
- 26 September 1987 Portsmouth 2-1 Wimbledon
- 3 January 1988 Southampton 0-2 Portsmouth
- 19 April 1988 Wimbledon 2-2 Portsmouth
