= Gerald Ashby =

English football referee (1949–2001)

- Full name: Gerald R Ashby
- Born: 6 November 1949; Worcestershire, England
- Died: 17 December 2001 (aged 52); Worcestershire, England

Domestic
Years	League	Role
1982–1985	Football League	Asst. referee
1985–1992	Football League	Referee
1992–1998	Premier League	Referee

International
Years	League	Role
1992–1994	FIFA listed	Referee

Gerald R. Ashby (6 November 1949 – 17 December 2001) was an English football referee, who operated in the Football League and the Premier League. He was an accountant by profession, and was based in Worcester.

== Career ==
He became a Football League linesman in 1982, and three years later graduated to the referees' list at the age of thirty-five.^{†} His breakthrough came when the retirement age for FIFA referees was reduced to 45. This created five vacancies on the English allocation for the FIFA List in 1992, and he was one of the officials to be promoted. At the same time, he became a member of the new Premier League list.^{‡}

His first match in the new league was the 2–1 home victory by Leeds United over Wimbledon at Elland Road on 15 August 1992.

He only had three years as an international referee before he also reached FIFA's retirement age at the end of 1994. However, he was able to carry on in English football, and on 20 May 1995, at Wembley, he took charge of the FA Cup Final between Everton and Manchester United. Everton won the match 1–0 via a headed goal by Paul Rideout.

He remained on the Premier League list until his retirement; his final match, on 3 May 1998, seeing champions Arsenal beat Everton 4–0 at Highbury. He then became a Premier League referees' assessor.

Gerald Ashby died of a heart attack in December 2001.
