= Barry Horne (footballer) =

Welsh footballer (born 1962)

Personal information
- Full name: Barry Horne
- Date of birth: 18 May 1962 (age 64)
- Place of birth: St Asaph, Wales
- Height: 5 ft 10 in (1.78 m)
- Position: Midfielder

Youth career
- Flint Town United
- Hawarden Rangers
- Liverpool
- Courtaulds
- –1984: Rhyl

Senior career*
Years	Team	Apps	(Gls)
1984–1987	Wrexham	136	(16)
1987–1989	Portsmouth	70	(7)
1989–1992	Southampton	112	(6)
1992–1996	Everton	123	(3)
1996–1997	Birmingham City	33	(0)
1997–2000	Huddersfield Town	64	(1)
2000	Sheffield Wednesday	7	(0)
2000–2001	Kidderminster Harriers	27	(1)
2001	Walsall	3	(0)
2001–2002	Belper Town		
Total		575	(34)

International career
1988–1996	Wales	59	(2)
- * Club domestic league appearances and goals

Barry Horne (born 18 May 1962) is a Welsh former professional footballer, former chairman of the Professional Footballers' Association and sports television pundit.

As a player, he was a midfielder from 1984 until 2002, notably playing in the Premier League for Everton. He also played in the Football League for Wrexham, Portsmouth, Southampton, Birmingham City, Huddersfield Town, Sheffield Wednesday, Walsall and Kidderminster Harriers before playing in Non League for Belper Town. He was capped 59 times by Wales, scoring twice.

Since retirement Horne has worked as the chairman of the PFA, as well as mixing sports punditry with a role as Director of Football at Wrexham.

== Playing career ==
In his career Horne played for Wrexham, Portsmouth, Southampton, Everton, Birmingham, Huddersfield (where he scored once against Bristol City), Sheffield Wednesday, Kidderminster Harriers (where he scored on his debut against Torquay United), Walsall and Belper Town.

While at Wrexham, he was responsible for one of the most memorable moments in the club's history, a vital away goal in a 4–3 defeat against Porto in the first round of the European Cup-Winners' Cup in October 1984. Wrexham had won the first leg 1–0, and Horne's 89th-minute strike ensured that they progressed to the second round of the competition, where they lost to Roma.

He captained the Welsh national team and won the FA Cup in 1995 whilst playing for Everton.

His Welsh senior debut came on 9 September 1987, aged 25, in a 1–0 win over Denmark in a Euro 88 qualifier at Cardiff Arms Park. The last of his 59 caps for Wales came a decade later on 29 March 1997 in a 2–1 home win over Belgium in a World Cup qualifier, also at Cardiff Arms Park.

=== Everton ===
His most successful spell as a player was at Everton between 1992 and 1996. On 15 August 1992, he had the distinction of scoring Everton's first Premier League goal, a 44th-minute equaliser in a 1–1 home draw against Sheffield Wednesday. Horne's most famous goal in an Everton shirt came on the final day of the 1993–94 season in a home game against Wimbledon, where Everton had to win to survive relegation. Horne scored a 30-yard screamer in the 67th minute to level the score at 2–2, and Graham Stuart went on to score the winning goal to complete a spectacular comeback and secure Everton's Premiership status. It was the only goal Horne had scored in the FA Carling Premiership that season. Soon after he won Everton's Footballer of the Year 1995 award. The other goal Horne scored for Everton came against his former club Southampton in February 1996 (a 2–2 draw).

As a player, Horne was known for being a "midfield ball-winner" with a ferocious tackle.

== Director of football ==
In November 2011, Horne returned to professional football when on a volunteer basis he became a director at Wrexham Football Club – the club that gave him in his first opportunity in professional football – when Wrexham Supporters Trust became the first ever Supporters Trust to take over a professional football club as a going concern. He was Director of Football at the Racecourse for almost five years, until he stepped down in October 2016.

== Media career ==
He is on a football related chat show on Merseyside radio station Radio City 96.7. He has also done punditry work on Match of the Day, and sometimes does commentary and punditry work for Sky Sports. Horne also writes a football column in the Liverpool Echo newspaper.

The Welsh supporters' brass band are named The Barry Horns in homage to the footballer.

== Personal life ==
Horne has a first-class degree in chemistry from the University of Liverpool. As of 2014, he was director of football and teacher of chemistry and physics at The King's School, Chester. He was appointed to the board of directors of Wrexham Football Club after the club was taken over by its Supporters Trust in November 2011.

== Career statistics ==
Appearances and goals by club, season and competition
Club	Season	League			FA Cup		League Cup		Other		Total	
Club	Season	Division	Apps	Goals	Apps	Goals	Apps	Goals	Apps	Goals	Apps	Goals
Wrexham
Wrexham	1984–85	Fourth Division	44	5	1	0	2	0	9 (Note: Appearances in Welsh Cup (3 appearances, 1 goal), Football League Trophy (2 appearances), and Cup Winners' Cup (4 appearances, 1 goal))	2	56	7
Wrexham	1985–86	Fourth Division	46	3	3	1	4	1	9 (Note: Appearances in Welsh Cup (7 appearances, 4 goals) and Football League Trophy (2 appearances))	4	62	9
Wrexham	1986–87	Fourth Division	46	8	3	1	4	0	13 (Note: Appearances in Welsh Cup (3 appearances, 1 goal), Football League Trophy (4 appearances, 1 goal) and Cup Winners' Cup (4 appearances, 1 goal))	3	66	12
Wrexham	Total		136	16	7	2	10	1	31	9	184	28
Portsmouth
Portsmouth	1987–88	First Division	39	3	4	0	2	0	—		45	3
Portsmouth	1988–89	Second Division	31	4	2	0	1	0	—		34	4
Portsmouth	Total		70	7	6	0	3	0	0	0	79	7
Southampton
Southampton	1988–89	First Division	11	0	0	0	0	0	—		11	0
Southampton	1989–90	First Division	29	4	3	1	5	1	—		37	6
Southampton	1990–91	First Division	38	1	5	0	6	1	2 (Note: Appearance in Full Members' Cup Final)	1	51	3
Southampton	1991–92	First Division	34	1	7	2	6	1	5	0	52	4
Southampton	Total		112	6	15	3	17	3	7	1	151	13
Everton
Everton	1992–93	Premier League	34	1	1	0	6	0	—		41	1
Everton	1993–94	Premier League	32	1	2	0	5	0	—		39	1
Everton	1994–95	Premier League	31	0	5	0	0	0	—		36	0
Everton	1995–96	Premier League	26	1	4	0	2	0	3 (Note: Appearances in Charity Shield (1 appearance) and Cup Winners' Cup (2 appearances))	0	35	1
Everton	Total		123	3	12	0	13	0	3	0	151	3
Birmingham City	1996–97	First Division	33	0	3	0	4	0	—		40	0
Huddersfield Town
Huddersfield Town	1997–98	First Division	30	0	2	0	0	0	—		32	0
Huddersfield Town	1998–99	First Division	20	1	0	0	4	0	—		24	1
Huddersfield Town	1999–2000	First Division	14	0	0	0	3	0	—		17	0
Huddersfield Town	Total		64	1	2	0	7	0	0	0	73	1
Sheffield Wednesday	1999–2000	Premier League	7	0	0	0	0	0	—		7	0
Kidderminster Harriers	2000–01	Third Division	27	1	3	0	2	0	2 (Note: Appearances in Football League Trophy)	0	34	1
Walsall	2000–01	Second Division	3	0	0	0	0	0	—		3	0
Career total			575	34	48	5	56	4	43	10	722	53

== Honours ==
Southampton

- Full Members Cup runner-up: 1991–92

Everton

- FA Cup: 1994–95
- FA Charity Shield: 1995
