= David Unsworth =

English footballer (born 1973)

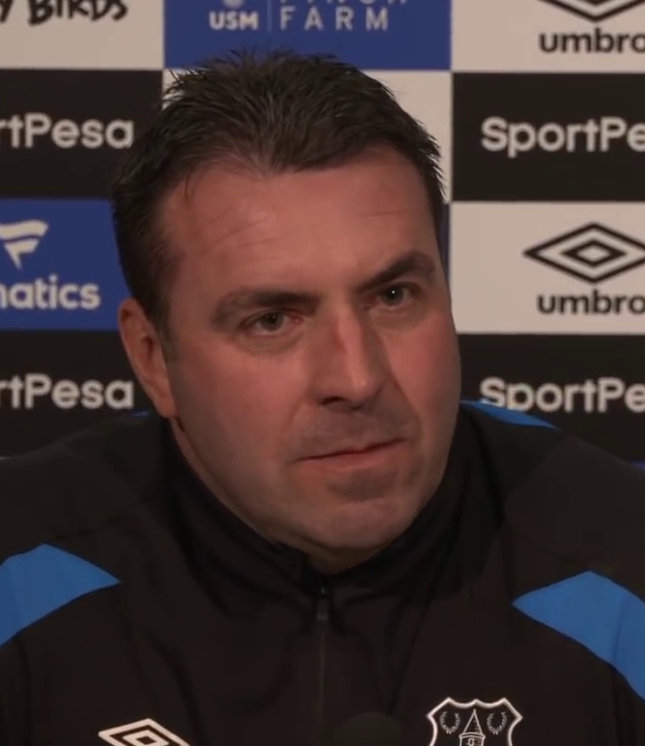
- Unsworth as Everton caretaker manager in 2017

Personal information
- Full name: David Gerald Unsworth
- Date of birth: 16 October 1973 (age 53)
- Place of birth: Chorley, England
- Height: 6 ft 1 in (1.85 m)
- Positions: Centre-back; left-back

Youth career
- –1992: Everton

Senior career*
Years	Team	Apps	(Gls)
1992–1997	Everton	116	(11)
1997–1998	West Ham United	32	(2)
1998	Aston Villa	0	(0)
1998–2004	Everton	188	(23)
2004–2005	Portsmouth	15	(2)
2005	→ Ipswich Town (loan)	16	(1)
2005–2007	Sheffield United	39	(4)
2007	Wigan Athletic	10	(1)
2007–2008	Burnley	29	(1)
2008–2009	Huddersfield Town	4	(0)
Total		449	(45)

International career
1994–1995	England U21	7	(0)
1995	England	1	(0)

Managerial career
- 2010–2011: Preston North End (caretaker)
- 2011–2012: Preston North End (caretaker)
- 2014–2022: Everton U23
- 2016: Everton (caretaker)
- 2017: Everton (caretaker)
- 2022–2023: Oldham Athletic
- * Club domestic league appearances and goals

David Gerald Unsworth (born 16 October 1973) is an English football coach and former professional footballer who was most recently the manager of Oldham Athletic. Prior to this, he was academy director and under-23s head coach at Premier League side Everton.

As a player, Unsworth played as a centre-back or left-back from 1991 until 2009. Unsworth is best remembered for his time at Everton during the 1990s, where he was part of their FA Cup-winning team of 1995 and acquired the nickname "Rhino". He earned one full England cap in 1995. He also played in the Premier League for West Ham United, Portsmouth, Sheffield United and Wigan Athletic, and in the Football League for Ipswich Town, Burnley and Huddersfield Town.

After retiring, he moved into coaching with Preston North End where he was twice appointed caretaker manager. He returned to Everton in September 2013 as assistant to Everton U21s head coach Alan Stubbs, and succeeded him in 2014. He was twice named caretaker manager of the club in 2016 and 2017.

== Club career ==
Born in Chorley, Lancashire, Unsworth began his career in the youth system at Everton. He made his first team debut in an away game at Tottenham Hotspur in April 1992. He made few appearances for the senior side until the appointment of Joe Royle as manager. Royle made Unsworth a regular member of the starting XI, and he was part of the 1995 FA Cup winning team. After 133 league and cup games over several impressive seasons at Everton, Unsworth transferred to West Ham United for the 1997–98 season. He made his West Ham debut on 23 August 1997 against his old club, Everton. After receiving an ovation from Everton fans, Unsworth was on the losing side as West Ham lost 2–1. After his family failed to settle in London and only one season and 41 games he asked for a move closer to his Merseyside home. Rather than moving back to Merseyside, he was signed by Birmingham-based club Aston Villa for £3 million but his family did not settle in Birmingham. After only a month, before the season had even begun, citing problems with the lengthy commute from his home, he returned to Everton who paid Villa the same £3 million West Ham had accepted only a few weeks before.

Unsworth was a consistent performer in his second spell with Everton, being first choice left-back, but also scoring some vital goals in his role as dead-ball specialist, mostly penalties. At the end of the 2003–04 season, after a further 216 games and his contract expired, a disagreement with the club over the length of a new contract led to Unsworth leaving on a free transfer.

On 12 July 2004, he was signed by Portsmouth for the 2004–05 season on a free transfer. He made his debut in a 1–1 home draw with Birmingham City, scoring the equaliser from a penalty. He also scored another spot-kick in Portsmouth's famous 2–0 victory over Manchester United in October 2004. However, following the resignation of manager Harry Redknapp, Unsworth lost his place having played just 18 games, and spent the second half of the season on loan at Ipswich Town, making 16 appearances, scoring on his debut against Sheffield United.

On 22 August 2005, Unsworth was signed by Sheffield United on a three-year contract, on a free transfer after it became clear that Ipswich Town could not afford his wages. He was part of the team which were promoted to the Premier League as Championship runners-up at the end of the season. He missed a penalty for United in a 0–0 draw against Blackburn Rovers on 9 September 2006. Unsworth fell out of favour at Sheffield United under the management of Neil Warnock, and was placed on the transfer list in the January window.

On 5 January 2007, Unsworth signed for Wigan Athletic from Sheffield United on a free transfer. He played his first match on 13 January against Chelsea. On the last day of the 2006–07 Premier League season, in a twist of fate, Unsworth would score the penalty that sent down his former club Sheffield United, whilst simultaneously saving his new employers Wigan Athletic from relegation. Unsworth was released by Wigan at the end of the 2006–07 season on 17 May 2007.

On 11 August, he signed for Burnley on a one-year contract, scoring his first goal against Leicester City. At the end of the season, he was offered a new deal as a player-coach by manager Owen Coyle, but he rejected the offer and left the club on 30 June 2008.

On 8 August 2008, Unsworth joined Huddersfield Town on a one-year deal after impressing on trial in their pre-season. He along with five other players made his debut in a 1–1 draw against Stockport County at the Galpharm Stadium on 9 August 2008. Unsworth missed a penalty in a 2–1 defeat away at Millwall on 30 August 2008 and did not feature again. He was released from his contract on 30 March 2009 after making four appearances, and announced his retirement from football shortly afterwards.

== International career ==
Unsworth was part of England's U20 squad that finished third at the 1993 FIFA World Youth Championship in Australia, scoring the first goal in their 2–1 third-place play-off win over Australia at the Sydney Football Stadium. He played for the England under-21 team on 7 occasions between 1994 and 1995. He made a single appearance for England's senior team, in a 2–1 victory against Japan at Wembley on 3 June 1995.

== Coaching career ==
Unsworth announced his retirement on 3 April 2009. After retiring, he joined Preston North End as development coach. He was promoted to first team coach following the departure of Alan Irvine, and appointed caretaker manager on 30 December 2010 following the departure of Darren Ferguson, until the arrival of Phil Brown on 6 January 2011. On the dismissal of Brown and his assistant Brian Horton, Unsworth was appointed caretaker manager in December 2011 with Graham Alexander. On the appointment of new manager Graham Westley, Unsworth was dismissed.

He turned down the chance to manage Irish club Sligo Rovers in 2012. On 6 December 2012, Unsworth returned to former club Sheffield United as Head of Academy Coaching. Following the departure of Blades manager Danny Wilson in April 2013, Unsworth was named as assistant to caretaker-manager Chris Morgan at United. The following summer, and having reverted to his previous role following the arrival of David Weir as club manager, Unsworth was given permission to speak with Kilmarnock about their vacant managerial position. However, Unsworth rejected the approach, only to subsequently leave the Blades on 1 August 2013.

Since departing Sheffield United, he had been working alongside the Scottish FA as a course tutor and within the Everton academy system. In September 2013, he was appointed as assistant manager of the Everton U21 team, working with Alan Stubbs. In 2014, Stubbs moved to Hibernian, leaving Unsworth in charge. In May 2016, following the departure of Roberto Martínez as Everton manager, Unsworth took charge of the final game of the 2015–16 Premier League, a 3–0 win over Norwich City, alongside Joe Royle in a caretaker capacity. He returned to coaching Everton's Under-23 team following the appointment of Ronald Koeman as first team manager. After Koeman was sacked on 23 October 2017, Unsworth again became caretaker manager of the senior side. On 12 April 2022, Unsworth left Everton in order to pursue his ambition of becoming a first-team manager.

On 20 September 2022, Unsworth was appointed manager of National League club Oldham Athletic. He lost his first game in charge, a 3–0 defeat at Bromley. After a seven game winless run, Unsworth was sacked by Oldham on 17 September 2023. His final game in charge was another 3-0 defeat at Bromley.

== Career statistics ==
Appearances and goals by club, season and competition
Club	Season	League			FA Cup		League Cup		Other		Total	
Club	Season	Division	Apps	Goals	Apps	Goals	Apps	Goals	Apps	Goals	Apps	Goals
Everton	1991–92	First Division	2	1	0	0	0	0	0	0	2	1
Everton	1992–93	Premier League	3	0	0	0	2	0	—		5	0
Everton	1993–94	Premier League	8	0	0	0	0	0	—		8	0
Everton	1994–95	Premier League	38	3	5	0	2	0	—		45	3
Everton	1995–96	Premier League	31	2	2	0	1	0	4 (Note: One appearance in FA Charity Shield; three appearances one goal in UEFA Cup Winners' Cup)	1	38	3
Everton	1996–97	Premier League	34	5	0	0	2	0	—		36	5
Everton	Total		116	11	7	0	7	0	4	1	134	12
West Ham United	1997–98	Premier League	32	2	4	0	5	0	—		41	2
Aston Villa	1998–99	Premier League	0	0	0	0	0	0	0	0	0	0
Everton	1998–99	Premier League	34	1	3	1	3	0	—		40	2
Everton	1999–2000	Premier League	33	6	5	3	1	0	—		39	9
Everton	2000–01	Premier League	29	5	1	0	2	0	—		32	5
Everton	2001–02	Premier League	33	3	4	0	0	0	—		37	3
Everton	2002–03	Premier League	33	5	1	0	3	1	—		37	6
Everton	2003–04	Premier League	26	3	3	0	2	0	—		31	3
Everton	Total		188	23	17	4	11	1	—		216	28
Portsmouth	2004–05	Premier League	15	2	1	0	3	0	—		19	2
Ipswich Town (loan)	2004–05	Championship	16	1	0	0	0	0	0	0	16	1
Sheffield United	2005–06	Championship	34	4	0	0	0	0	—		34	4
Sheffield United	2006–07	Premier League	5	0	0	0	1	0	—		6	0
Sheffield United	Total		39	4	0	0	1	0	—		40	4
Wigan Athletic	2006–07	Premier League	10	1	0	0	0	0	—		10	1
Burnley	2007–08	Championship	29	1	0	0	2	0	—		31	1
Huddersfield Town	2008–09	League One	4	0	0	0	0	0	1 (Note: Appearance(s) in Football League Trophy)	0	5	0
Career total			449	45	29	4	29	1	5	1	512	51

== Managerial statistics ==
As of 16 September 2023

Team	From	To	Record				
Team	From	To	G	W	D	L	Win %
Preston North End (caretaker)	30 December 2010	6 January 2011	2	0	0	2	0.00
Preston North End (caretaker)	14 December 2011	16 January 2012	5	2	2	1	40.00
Everton (joint caretaker)	12 May 2016	14 June 2016	1	1	0	0	100.00
Everton (caretaker)	24 October 2017	29 November 2017	8	2	1	5	25.00
Oldham Athletic	20 September 2022	17 September 2023	51	14	18	19	27.45
Total			67	19	21	27	28.36

== Honours ==
Everton

- FA Cup: 1994–95
- FA Charity Shield: 1995

Sheffield United

- Football League Championship second-place promotion: 2005–06
