= Bill Kenny (English footballer) =

English footballer

Bill Kenny is an English retired professional soccer forward who played at least one season in the American Soccer League. In 1977, he scored seven goals in twenty games for the Cleveland Cobras.
