= Paul Rideout =

English footballer

Personal information
- Date of birth: 14 August 1964 (age 62)
- Place of birth: Bournemouth, England
- Position: Striker

Team information
- Current team: Real Salt Lake Arizona (ECNL/APL Teams)

Senior career*
Years	Team	Apps	(Gls)
1980–1983	Swindon Town	95	(38)
1983–1985	Aston Villa	54	(19)
1985–1988	Bari	99	(23)
1988–1991	Southampton	75	(19)
1990–1991	→ Swindon Town (loan)	9	(1)
1991	Notts County	11	(3)
1992	Rangers	12	(1)
1992–1997	Everton	112	(29)
1997	Qianwei Huandao	18	(2)
1998–1999	Kansas City Wizards	27	(4)
1999	Chongqing Longxin	26	(2)
2000	Shenzhen Pingan	10	(0)
2000–2002	Tranmere Rovers	46	(6)
Total		594	(147)

International career
1982–1983	England Youth	7	(1)
1984–1986	England U21	6	(1)
- * Club domestic league appearances and goals

Paul Rideout (born 14 August 1964) is an English former professional footballer and youth team coach of Real Salt Lake Arizona's ECNL and APL teams.

As a player, Rideout was a striker from 1980 until 2002, notably in the Premier League with Everton where he scored the winning goal in the 1995 FA Cup final against Manchester United at Wembley Stadium. He also played in his native land for Swindon Town, Aston Villa, Southampton, Notts County and Tranmere Rovers. During his career he also spent time in Italy, Scotland, China and the United States with Bari, Rangers, Qianwei Huandao, Chongqing Huandao, Shenzhen Jianlibao and Kansas City Wizards. He was capped 6 times by England U21, scoring one goal. He later moved into coaching and worked back with the Kansas City Wizards across their youth academy.

== Club career ==
=== Swindon Town ===
Rideout's career began as a 15-year-old at Swindon Town as their youngest ever first team player, and he finished the 1980–81 season with four goals from 16 Third Division games. He established himself as a first team player in 1981–82 by playing 35 games and scoring 14 goals, though it was not enough to save Swindon from relegation to the Fourth Division he initially decided to remain at the County Ground to help them win promotion. After they failed to win promotion in 1982–83, despite Rideout's 20 goals in 44 games, he was transferred to First Division club Aston Villa for £200,000 by manager Tony Barton.

=== Aston Villa ===
He scored five goals in 25 league games during his first season as a First Division player at Villa Park, and also helped them reach the Football League Cup semi finals, though they could only manage a 10th-place finish in the league. He remained a first team player the following season under new manager Graham Turner, scoring 14 goals in 29 games though Villa finished mid table once again.

=== Bari and Southampton ===
Then came a transfer to Italian team Bari, where Rideout spent three years before returning to England in a £430,000 move to Southampton on 5 July 1988.

Rideout was initially a regular first team player at The Dell, but the form of Alan Shearer in March 1991 cost him his place in the side after 71 league games and 19 goals, and he then dropped down a division with a nine-game loan spell at Swindon Town, where he scored once, before returning to Southampton for the 1991–92 season.

=== Notts County ===
He made four more appearances for The Saints, failing to score a goal, before he was sold to Notts County for £250,000 on 16 September 1991, just after they began their first top division season since 1984. However, they were already struggling to avoid relegation from the First Division and manager Neil Warnock saw Rideout as the man to help County preserve their top flight status and gain a place in the new FA Premier League which would begin the following season. However, he lasted barely four months at Meadow Lane, scoring three goals in 11 league games (his performances failed to improve County's league form and they ended the season relegated).

=== Rangers ===
He joined Rangers for £500,000 on 10 January 1992. He scored once in 11 games, providing adequate backup for the strike partnership of Mark Hateley and Ally McCoist, as Rangers won the double of the Scottish Premier Division and SFA Cup, and played one game in the 1992–93 Scottish league season.

=== Everton ===
He returned to England in a £500,000 move to Everton on 14 August 1992 – the day before their first game in the new Premier League. Among his fellow strikers was Mo Johnston – the player whose gap he had effectively filled at Rangers just months earlier.

Rideout's first season at Goodison Park was something of a disappointment, as he managed just three goals in 24 games and was unable to break up the strike partnership of Peter Beardsley and Tony Cottee, and it was a similar story the following season (despite Beardsley's departure to Newcastle United) as he managed just 24 league appearances once again, though he did improve his goals tally to six for the 1993–94 season. It was not a good time for Everton, either, as their Premier League debut had brought them a 13th-place finish, and after going top of the Premier League by winning their first three games of the 1993–94 season, their form slumped dramatically (failing to improve after Mike Walker succeeded Howard Kendall as manager in mid season) and they only narrowly avoided relegation.

The 1994–95 season was a successful one in Rideout's career. He scored 14 goals from 29 Premier League games, with Everton overcoming a 12-match winless league start and finishing in 15th place. He additionally scored the only goal of the FA Cup final as Everton won their first major trophy since 1987. Beardsley, Cottee and Johnston were now gone, and Rideout had strike partner Duncan Ferguson and Daniel Amokachi as deputy. He scored six goals in 25 league games to help them finish sixth in 1995–96. The following season saw him restricted to 10 league appearances, during which he failed to score, and at the end of the campaign he left the club.

=== Later career ===
He transferred to Qianwei Huandao in China, where he was voted 'Best Overseas player' in the Chinese League. He then moved to the United States of America in 1998 to play for the Kansas City Wizards from 1998 to 1999 before returning to the Chinese league until 2000, playing for Shenzhen Jianlibao.

Rideout returned to England – and to Merseyside – in 2000 to sign for Tranmere Rovers, where he played until May 2002, before being appointed to the club's coaching staff as an assistant with Tranmere Rovers Youth Academy. His time at Tranmere Rovers is most memorable for the FA Cup match against former club Southampton, in which he scored three of four second half goals to win the game after his team had been 3–0 down at half-time, Stuart Barlow scoring the other. However, on the league scene it was not a successful time for player and club. They were relegated in bottom place at the end of his first season after a decade of second-tier football, which had seen manager John Aldridge forced out of his job after five years at the helm. His successor was Rideout's former Everton captain Dave Watson, who was unable to guide Tranmere to promotion from Division Two in the 2001–02 season. Rideout then retired from playing and Watson resigned as Tranmere manager.

== International career ==
Although he did not represent the England national football team at full-level, he played several times for England at schoolboy, under-18 and under-21 level. At international level he scored over thirty goals, including a hat-trick for England schoolboys in a match lost 5–4 to Scotland at Wembley Stadium.

== Coaching career ==
Following his spell coaching at the club's academy, Rideout then returned to the United States and began coaching with the Kansas City Wizards, managing all three of the club's youth squads. Rideout also coaches a U17 girl's teams and a U16 boys team.

== Career statistics ==
Appearances and goals by club, season and competition
Club	Season	League			FA Cup		League Cup		Other		Total	
Club	Season	Division	Apps	Goals	Apps	Goals	Apps	Goals	Apps	Goals	Apps	Goals
Swindon Town
Swindon Town	1980–81	Third Division	16	4	0	0	0	0	—		16	4
Swindon Town	1981–82	Third Division	35	14	2	0	1	0	—		38	14
Swindon Town	1982–83	Fourth Division	44	20	5	1	2	2	—		51	23
Swindon Town	Total		95	38	7	1	3	2	0	0	105	41
Aston Villa
Aston Villa	1983–84	First Division	25	5	1	0	4	2	1 (Note: Appearances in Europa League)	0	31	7
Aston Villa	1984–85	First Division	29	14	1	0	2	1	—		32	15
Aston Villa	Total		54	19	2	0	6	3	1	0	63	22
Bari
Bari	1985–86	Serie A	28	6	5 (Note: Appearances in Coppa Italia)	1	0	0	—		33	7
Bari	1986–87	Serie B	34	10	5	0	0	0	—		39	10
Bari	1987–88	Serie B	37	7	5	0	0	0	—		42	7
Bari	Total		99	23	15	1	0	0	0	0	114	24
Southampton
Southampton	1988–89	First Division	24	6	2	0	4	1	—		30	7
Southampton	1989–90	First Division	31	7	3	0	7	1	—		41	8
Southampton	1990–91	First Division	16	6	2	0	2	0	1 (Note: Appearances in Full Members' Cup)	0	21	6
Southampton	1991–92	First Division	4	0	0	0	0	0	—		4	0
Southampton	Total		75	19	7	0	13	2	1	0	96	21
Swindon Town (loan)	1990–91	Second Division	9	1	0	0	0	0	—		9	1
Notts County	1991–92	First Division	11	3	1	0	2	0	2	0	16	3
Rangers
Rangers	1991–92	Scottish Premier League	11	1	2 (Note: Appearances in Scottish FA Cup)	0	0	0	—		13	1
Rangers	1992–93	Scottish Premier League	1	0	0	0	1 (Note: Appearances in Scottish League Cup)	0	—		2	0
Rangers	Total		12	1	2	0	1	0	0	0	15	1
Everton
Everton	1992–93	Premier League	24	3	1	0	4	2	—		29	5
Everton	1993–94	Premier League	24	6	1	1	3	4	—		28	11
Everton	1994–95	Premier League	29	14	5	2	2	0	—		36	16
Everton	1995–96	Premier League	25	6	2	0	2	0	5 (Note: Appearances in Community Shield (1 appearance) and Cup Winners' Cup (4 appearances, 1 goal))	1	34	7
Everton	1996–97	Premier League	10	0	1	0	2	1	—		13	1
Everton	Total		112	29	10	3	13	7	5	1	140	40
Qianwei Huandao	1997	Chinese Jia-A League	18	2	0	0	0	0	—		18	2
Sporting Kansas Wizards	1998	Major League Soccer	27	4	1 (Note: Appearances in U.S. Open Cup)	1	0	0	—		28	5
Chongqing Longxin	1999	Chinese Jia-A League	26	2	0	0	0	0	—		26	2
Shenzhen Pingan	2000	Chinese Jia-A League	10	0	0	0	0	0	—		10	0
Tranmere Rovers
Tranmere Rovers	2000–01	First Division	31	2	5	3	5	2	—		41	7
Tranmere Rovers	2001–02	Second Division	15	4	3	1	0	0	—		18	5
Tranmere Rovers	Total		46	6	8	4	5	2	0	0	59	12
Career total			594	147	53	10	43	16	9	1	699	174

== Honours ==
Rangers

- Scottish Premier Division: 1991–92
- Scottish Cup: 1991–92

Everton

- FA Cup: 1994–95
- FA Charity Shield: 1995

Individual

- PFA Team of the Year: 1982–83 Fourth Division
- Swindon Town Player of the Season: 1982–83
