= Billy Kenny (Australian footballer) =

Australian rules footballer

Personal information
- Full name: William John Kenny
- Born: 17 September 1871; South Melbourne, Victoria
- Died: 19 May 1932 (aged 60); Kew, Victoria
- Original team: Napier Imperials

Playing career^{1}
Years	Club	Games (Goals)
1898	South Melbourne	2 (0)
- ^{1} Playing statistics correct to the end of 1898.

Billy Kenny (17 September 1871 – 19 May 1932) was an Australian rules footballer who played with South Melbourne in the Victorian Football League (VFL).

His son Bill Kenny also played for South Melbourne, in 1919.
