= Billy Kenny (footballer, born 1951) =

English footballer

Personal information
- Full name: William Aidan Kenny
- Date of birth: 23 October 1951 (age 75)
- Place of birth: Liverpool, England
- Position: Midfielder

Senior career*
Years	Team	Apps	(Gls)
1971–1974	Everton	14	(0)
1974–1977	Tranmere Rovers	54	(6)
1977	Cleveland Cobras	20	(7)
1977	Ashton United	3	(0)
- * Club domestic league appearances and goals

William Kenny (born 23 October 1951) is an English former professional footballer who played for Everton, Tranmere Rovers and Ashton United.

He is the father of Billy Kenny, Jr., also a former professional footballer.
