= Bill Kenny (hurler) =

Irish hurler (1899–1978)

Personal information
- Native name: Liam Ó Cionnaith (Irish)
- Born: 1899 Ballyragget, County Kilkenny, Ireland
- Died: 8 February 1978 (aged 78) Ballyragget, County Kilkenny, Ireland
- Occupation: Farmer

Sport
- Sport: Hurling
- Position: Midfield
Club
- Years: Club
- 1920-1930: Dicksboro
Club titles
- Kilkenny titles: 2
Inter-county
- Years: County
- 1922-1927: Kilkenny
Inter-county titles
- Leinster titles: 3
- All-Irelands: 1

William Kenny (1899 - 8 February 1978) was an Irish hurler. A versatile player who lined out as a half-back, a midfielder and a half-forward, he was a member of the Kilkenny team that won the 1922 All-Ireland Championship.

Kenny enjoyed a decade-long club career with Dicksboro. During that time he won county championship medals in 1923 and 1926.

After being selected for the Kilkenny senior team in 1922, Kenny was a regular on the team at various times over subsequent seasons. He won his first Leinster medal in 1922 before later winning his sole All-Ireland medal after Kilkenny's defeat of Tipperary in the final. Kenny won subsequent Leinster medals in 1923 and 1925.

A member of the Old IRA in his youth, Kenny was also heavily involved in coursing. He died after a short illness on 8 February 1978.

== Honours ==
Dicksboro

- Kilkenny Senior Hurling Championship (2): 1923, 1926

Kilkenny

- All-Ireland Senior Hurling Championship (1): 1922
- Leinster Senior Hurling Championship (3): 1922, 1923, 1925
