= William Stopford Kenny =

William Stopford Kenny (1788 – 16 November 1867) was a British schoolmaster, a writer and compiler of educational works, and an accomplished chessplayer who published and translated several works on the game.

Kenny ran a Catholic day-school at 5 Fitzroy Street, Fitzroy Square. He edited, compiled, and wrote many educational works, such as The History of England (1850, with William Godwin), Kenny's School Geography (1856), and Tales About the Sun, Moon, Stars, and Comets (1862, with Samuel Goodrich). Kenny was a chessplayer - several of his games were recorded - and published several works on the game, including Practical Chess Grammar (1817) and Practical Chess Exercises (1818). He also translated Philidor's Analysis of the Game of Chess into English, with notes.

== Family works ==
His son William David Kenny was also a schoolmaster, and wrote and edited works similar to those of his father. William David Kenny's son Charles Stopford Kenny, a government clerk, married Louisa Tussaud, a granddaughter of Marie Tussaud, and was involved (financially at least) with the Tussauds' wax museum business.

== Death ==
William died in London, aged 79.
