= Bill Kenny (Australian footballer) =

Australian rules footballer (1897–1978)

Personal information
- Full name: William John Kenny
- Born: 30 July 1897; Albert Park, Victoria
- Died: 29 December 1978 (aged 81); Canberra
- Original team: South Melbourne Districts

Playing career^{1}
| Years | Club | Games (Goals) |
| 1919 | South Melbourne | 2 (0) |
- ^{1} Playing statistics correct to the end of 1919.

William John Kenny MBE (30 July 1897 – 29 December 1978) was an Australian rules footballer who played with South Melbourne in the Victorian Football League (VFL).

He spent 49 years working for the Royal Australian Navy, becoming Head of Naval Personnel Branch before retiring in 1962. He was appointed as a Member of the Order of the British Empire (MBE) for services to the Navy in the New Year's Honours list of 1963.

Kenny's father Billy also played for South Melbourne.
