= Daniel Amokachi =

Nigerian footballer (born 1972)

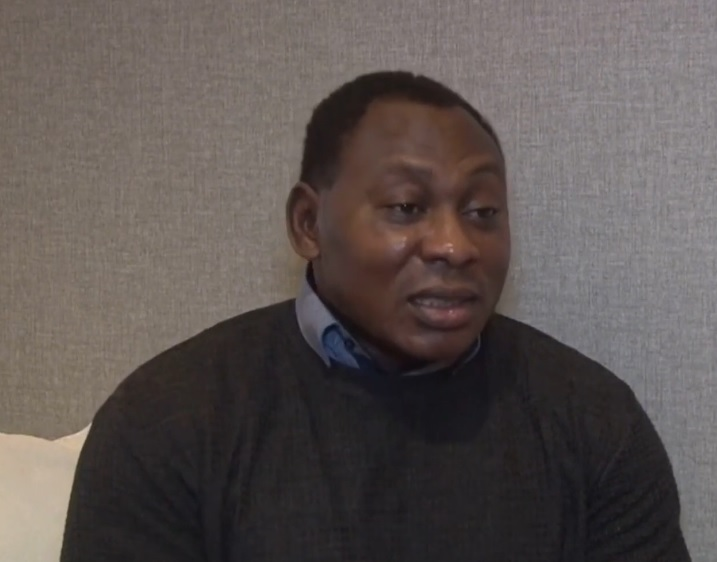

Personal information
- Full name: Daniel Owefin Amokachi
- Date of birth: 30 December 1972 (age 53)
- Place of birth: Kaduna, Nigeria
- Height: 1.80 m (5 ft 11 in)
- Position: Forward

Senior career*
Years	Team	Apps	(Gls)
1989–1990	Ranchers Bees		
1990–1994	Club Brugge	81	(35)
1994–1996	Everton	43	(10)
1996–2000	Beşiktaş	77	(18)
Total		201	(63)

International career
1990–1999	Nigeria	44	(13)

Managerial career
- 2006–2007: Nasarawa United
- 2007: Nigeria (assistant)
- 2008: Enyimba
- 2008–2014: Nigeria (assistant)
- 2014–2015: Nigeria (interim)
- 2015: Ifeanyi Ubah
- 2016–2017: JS Hercules
- 2017–2018: JS Hercules (technical director)
- 2020–: Nigeria (football ambassador)
Medal record
Representing Nigeria
Men's Football
Gold medal – first place	1996 Atlanta	Team competition
- * Club domestic league appearances and goals

Daniel Owefin Amokachi (born 30 December 1972) is a Nigerian football manager and former professional player.

As a player, he was a forward who notably played in the Premier League for Everton and was part of their 1995 FA Cup winning team. He also played top flight football in both Belgium and Turkey with extended spells at Club Brugge and Beşiktaş. Whilst with Brugge in 1992, he scored the club's first goal in the UEFA Champions League. He also had a brief spell with Ranchers Bees, Colorado Rapids and Nasarawa United. He was capped 44 times by Nigeria, scoring 13 goals. His spell in international football saw him win the African Cup of Nations in 1994 and a gold medal at the 1996 Olympics. He was also present in his nations squads for 1994 FIFA World Cup and 1998 FIFA World Cup.

Upon retiring, Amokachi moved into coaching and has spent time as manager of Nasarawa United, Enyimba, Ifeanyi Ubah and JS Hercules. He has also spent two spells as assistant coach of Nigeria, as well as managing his nation in an interim basis from 2014 to 2015.

== Club career ==
Amokachi, nicknamed "The Bull", was discovered while playing for Ranchers Bees by Nigerian national team coach Clemens Westerhof, who brought the talented player to the 1990 African Nations Cup, and soon Amokachi moved to play for Club Brugge in Belgium. He competed in the new format of the Champions League, and became the first player to score in the competition, after his goal secured a 1–0 win in the opening match in the group stage against CSKA Moscow. Performing well in Belgium and at the 1994 World Cup, Everton became interested in Amokachi and their manager Mike Walker signed him for a fee of £3 million ($4.7 million).

He went on to win the FA Cup with Everton in 1995, scoring two goals in the semi-final against Tottenham Hotspur after 'substituting himself' into the match while Paul Rideout was receiving treatment (the manager Joe Royle had only instructed him to warm up in preparation for possibly coming on). He appeared in the final only briefly, late on, again as a substitute but is remembered fondly for his beret-wearing celebrations afterwards.

He remained at Everton until the end of the 1995–96 season, when he was transferred to Beşiktaş of Turkey for a fee of £1.75 million. He had failed to make the impact at Goodison Park that many fans had been hoping for, and had been unable to win a regular place in the first team, as Rideout and Duncan Ferguson were firmly established as Everton's two strikers at that stage. He did, however, stand in for Ferguson while he spent six weeks in prison during the autumn of 1995 for an offence committed in Scotland 18 months earlier.

After leaving Beşiktaş in 1999, his playing career effectively ended. He signed with 1860 Munich, but the contract was cancelled after he failed a medical test. In turn he was rejected by Tranmere Rovers for the same reason. Amokachi trained with French second division side US Créteil, but the deal was hampered by injuries. American MLS team Colorado Rapids signed him in 2002, but seeing he was not fit enough they released him before a single match was played. He went to play in the United Arab Emirates, but was denied again due to his medical condition.

== International career ==
Amokachi made his debut for the Nigeria national football team in 1990 and subsequently became one of the national team's key forwards. He made 44 appearances for Nigeria and scored 13 goals.

Amokachi contributed to Nigeria's victory at the 1994 African Cup of Nations. The same year, he participated in the 1994 FIFA World Cup, held in the United States. He scored in Nigeria's group-stage match against Bulgaria, contributing to a 3–0 victory, and also scored against Greece in a 2–0 win. Nigeria advanced from the group stage to the round of 16, where they were eliminated after losing 2–1 to Italy in extra time.

In 1996, he represented Nigeria at the football tournament of the 1996 Summer Olympics in Atlanta. Nigeria defeated Brazil in the semi-finals to reach the final, where they defeated Argentina 3–2 to win the gold medal. Amokachi scored in the 74th minute of the final to help Nigeria level the score at 2–2. Nigeria became the first African nation to win the gold medal in men's Olympic football.

Amokachi also participated in the 1998 FIFA World Cup, but his opportunities to play were limited after he suffered a knee injury shortly before the tournament. He played approximately 66 minutes in Nigeria's group-stage match against Bulgaria, but was unable to feature in the remaining matches due to the injury. Nigeria advanced from the group stage to the round of 16, where they were eliminated after a 4–1 defeat to Denmark.

== Managerial career ==
Amokachi managed Nigerian club Nasarawa United and later Enyimba Aba. In April 2007, he quit his role as assistant coach of the Nigeria national team. On 10 April 2008, Amokachi was re-appointed to Nigeria's national team, the Super Eagles, as assistant coach to Shuaibu Amodu, and then as assistant to Stephen Keshi.

In 2015, Amokachi managed Ifeanyi Ubah, resigning after five weeks in the post. In January 2016, he was named as manager of JS Hercules. On 4 February 2020, Amokachi was named as Nigeria’s football ambassador by the President, Major General Muhammadu Buhari (retd).

== Personal life ==
Amokachi is married to a Tunisian woman and has twin sons named Kalim and Nazim, both of whom are currently in the Besiktas youth academy. He also has a daughter named Raya.

== Career statistics ==
=== Club ===
Appearances and goals by club, season and competition
Club	Season	League			National cup		League cup		Continental		Other		Total	
Club	Season	Division	Apps	Goals	Apps	Goals	Apps	Goals	Apps	Goals	Apps	Goals	Apps	Goals
Club Brugge	1990–91	Belgian First Division	3	0			—		0	0			3	0
Club Brugge	1991–92	Belgian First Division	26	12			—		6	1			32	13
Club Brugge	1992–93	Belgian First Division	23	9			—		6	1			29	10
Club Brugge	1993–94	Belgian First Division	28	14			—		—				28	14
Club Brugge	1994–95	Belgian First Division	1	0			—		0	0			1	0
Club Brugge	Total		81	35			—		12	2			93	37
Everton	1994–95	Premier League	18	4	2	2	2	0	—		—		22	6
Everton	1995–96	Premier League	25	6	3	1	1	0	3	1	0	0	32	8
Everton	Total		43	10	5	3	3	0	3	1	0	0	54	14
Beşiktaş	1996–97	1. Lig	30	7	5	1	—		8	2	0	0	43	10
Beşiktaş	1997–98	1. Lig	27	7	7	2	—		7	1	1	1	42	11
Beşiktaş	1998–99	1. Lig	20	4	5	0	—		2	0	0	0	27	4
Beşiktaş	Total		77	18	17	3	—		17	3	1	1	112	25
Career total			201	63	22	6	3	0	32	6	1	1	259	76

=== International ===
Appearances and goals by national team and year
National team	Year	Apps	Goals
Nigeria	1990	6	1
Nigeria	1991	4	1
Nigeria	1992	1	1
Nigeria	1993	5	2
Nigeria	1994	12	2
Nigeria	1995	5	2
Nigeria	1996	1	2
Nigeria	1997	5	2
Nigeria	1998	4	0
Nigeria	1999	1	0
Total		44	13

Scores and results list Nigeria's goal tally first, score column indicates score after each Amokachi goal.

List of international goals scored by Daniel Amokachi
No.	Date	Venue	Opponent	Score	Result	Competition
1	18 August 1990	Lagos, Nigeria	Togo	2–0	3–0	1992 African Cup of Nations qualification
2	27 April 1991	Lagos, Nigeria	Benin	3–0	3–0	1992 African Cup of Nations qualification
3	29 August 1992	Lagos, Nigeria	Uganda	1–0	2–0	1994 African Cup of Nations qualification
4	13 July 1993	Lagos, Nigeria	Algeria	4–1	4–1	1994 FIFA World Cup qualification
5	25 September 1993	Lagos, Nigeria	Ivory Coast	2–0	4–1	1994 FIFA World Cup qualification
6	21 June 1994	Dallas, United States	Bulgaria	2–0	3–0	1994 FIFA World Cup
7	30 June 1994	Boston, United States	Greece	2–0	2–0	1994 FIFA World Cup
8	6 January 1995	Riyadh, Saudi Arabia	Japan	3–0	3–0	1995 King Fahd Cup
9	13 January 1995	Riyadh, Saudi Arabia	Mexico	1–1	1–1 (a.e.t.)	1995 King Fahd Cup
10	9 November 1996	Lagos, Nigeria	Burkina Faso	1–0	2–0	1998 FIFA World Cup qualification
11	9 November 1996	Lagos, Nigeria	Burkina Faso	2–0	2–0	1998 FIFA World Cup qualification
12	5 April 1997	Lagos, Nigeria	Guinea	1–0	2–1	1998 FIFA World Cup qualification
13	5 April 1997	Lagos, Nigeria	Guinea	2–0	2–1	1998 FIFA World Cup qualification

== Honours ==
Everton

- FA Cup: 1994–95
- FA Charity Shield: 1995

Beşiktaş

- Turkish Cup: 1997–98
- Turkish Super Cup: 1998

Nigeria

- African Cup of Nations: 1994
- Olympic Games: Gold Medal 1996

Individual

- Beşiktaş's Super League 2000th goal.
- International Honorary Award of Sportsmen of Turkey: 2015
- African Footballer of the Year Third: 1994 (France Football), 1995, 1996
- UEFA Champions League First Goal: 1992
- Belgian Ebony Shoes Award: 1992,1994
- IFFHS 20th-century best player in Africa: 18th place
- West African Club Championship 'The best young footballer' award: 1989
- Pro League 'Most successful foreign player' award: 1992
- Beşiktaş J.K. Squads of Century (Bronze Team)
