= Tony Grant (English footballer) =

English footballer and coach

Personal information
- Full name: Anthony James Grant
- Date of birth: 14 November 1974 (age 51)
- Place of birth: Liverpool, England
- Height: 5 ft 9 in (1.75 m)
- Position: Midfielder

Team information
- Current team: Forest Green Rovers (assistant head coach)

Senior career*
Years	Team	Apps	(Gls)
1993–1999	Everton	94	(2)
1996	→ Swindon Town (loan)	3	(1)
1999	→ Tranmere Rovers (loan)	9	(0)
1999–2001	Manchester City	31	(0)
2000–2001	→ West Bromwich Albion (loan)	5	(0)
2001–2005	Burnley	141	(3)
2005–2006	Bristol City	0	(0)
2006–2007	Crewe Alexandra	14	(0)
2007	Accrington Stanley	6	(0)
2007–2008	Chester City	19	(1)
Total		322	(7)

International career
	England U21	1	(0)
- * Club domestic league appearances and goals

Anthony James Grant (born 14 November 1974) is an English football coach and former player, he is the assistant head coach of EFL League One club Forest Green Rovers.

A midfielder, he began his career with Premier League club Everton in 1993 and went on to play for Swindon Town, Tranmere Rovers, Manchester City, West Bromwich Albion, Burnley, Crewe Alexandra, Accrington Stanley and Chester City. He was capped once by England U21.

After retiring from playing in 2008, Grant has coached at a variety of clubs and as of 2023 is assistant manager at League One side Forest Green Rovers.

== Playing career ==
=== Everton ===
Tony Grant signed as a trainee for Everton. He made his debut for 'The Toffees' two years later in a 1–0 defeat at Manchester City in December 1993. He started as Everton won the 1995 FA Charity Shield. He scored his first league goal at Middlesbrough in March 1996. In January 1996, Grant signed for Swindon Town on loan; he played three games for 'The Robins', scoring one goal. Three years later, Grant was loaned out again, this time to Tranmere Rovers where he played eight games for them and scored one goal. His goal came in Tranmere's 2–0 win over Oxford United in the League Cup (Steve Yates getting the opener for Rovers). Tranmere reached the final of the League Cup that season, by which time Grant had returned to Everton. Grant's second and final league goal for Everton came in a 2–2 draw at Barnsley in February 1998.

=== Manchester City ===
On Christmas Eve, December 1999, Grant signed for Manchester City for a fee of £450,000. He made his debut for City in the 2–0 win over West Bromwich Albion, but during his time at City he never scored. Grant was then loaned out to West Bromwich Albion in December 2000, where he played five games for 'The Baggies'.

=== Later career ===
In October 2001, Grant moved to Burnley signing for a fee of £250,000. Grant soon became regarded as an excellent signing by Stan Ternent and went on to play 141 games for 'The Clarets', scoring three goals. During his time at Burnley he was most frequently played in the defensive-midfield role, which enabled him to display his range of passing and game-reading ability. Grant became an important member of the team, but was released on a free-transfer at the end of the 2005 season after refusing a new contract offer.

He then moved to Bristol City on a free transfer, but only played one game for them; Bristol City's 4–2 League Cup defeat to Barnet. In January 2006, after injury problems, Grant signed for Dario Gradi's Crewe Alexandra, and made ten appearances before the end of the 2005–06 season, but failed to rescue Crewe from relegation to League One. He signed a new one-year deal to play for Crewe on 1 June 2006.

On 31 January 2007, Grant joined Accrington Stanley as player–coach. He left the club at the end of the season. On 27 July 2007, Grant completed a move to Chester City, signing a one-year contract under new manager Bobby Williamson. He scored his only goal for the club in a 2–1 win at Rochdale on 18 August 2007. He left the club at the end of the season.

== Coaching career ==
Grant became player coach at Crewe Alexander 2006–2007, working closely with Dario Gradi at Championship and League One level. He then moved on to Accrington Stanley and Chester City 2007-2009 as first team player coach at League Two level. He joined Blackburn Rovers U18 as coach in 2010 to 2012, here he brought new ideas to the club with the emphasis on development. Here they won the Academy Elite league, finalists in the FA Youth Cup and also the Premier League cup, a feat unrivalled in the English academy system to date. Grant then moved to the first-team coach role for Blackburn Rovers from 2012 to 2015, here they survived relegation, reached the FA cup quarter final losing by the odd goal to Liverpool, they finished the League in 7th position just missing out on the playoffs. Grant returned to Everton as a first team European scout in October 2016. He was named Blackpool's assistant manager on 14 March 2019.

In 2020, Grant named the assistant coach of the Indian Super League side SC East Bengal, where Robbie Fowler signed as head coach.

== Business career ==
Grant is currently a director of A&K Football and Education Community Club C.I.C, a company incorporated by Kevin Kirby on 10 May 2023. On the 31 May 2023, Grant became a director. His role here is described as the A&K Director and Technical Head of Football Performance.
