= Billy Kenny (footballer, born 1973) =

English footballer

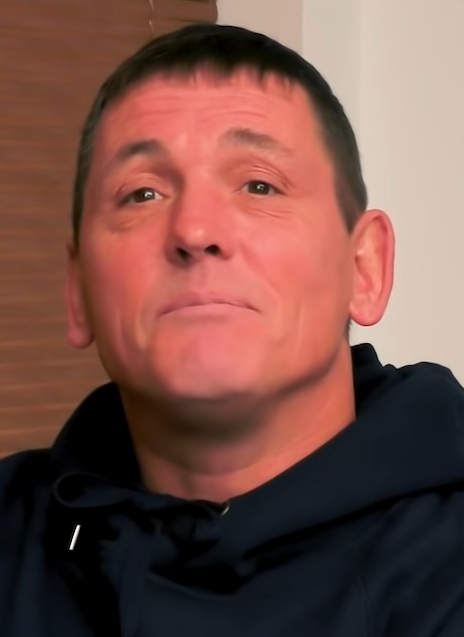
- Kenny in 2021

Personal information
- Full name: William Aidan Kenny
- Date of birth: 19 September 1973 (age 53)
- Place of birth: Liverpool, England
- Height: 5 ft 9 in (1.75 m)
- Position: Midfielder

Youth career
- Everton

Senior career*
Years	Team	Apps	(Gls)
1992–1994	Everton	17	(1)
1994–1995	Oldham Athletic	4	(0)
1995–1996	Barrow	2	(0)
2002	Royal Seaforth		

International career
1992	England U21	1	(0)
- * Club domestic league appearances and goals

William Aidan Kenny (born 19 September 1973) is an English former professional footballer who played as a midfielder for Everton and Oldham Athletic, making a total of 21 appearances in the Football League. Kenny retired from professional football at the age of just 21.

Kenny is the son of former Everton midfielder Billy Kenny Sr.

== Club career ==
Kenny was a product of Everton's youth system and made his debut in 1992 in a 1–1 home draw with Coventry City. In total Kenny made 17 league appearances for Everton, plus another 4 appearances in cup competitions, scoring one goal. He also made a single appearance for England under 21s in an Under 21 Championship qualifier against Turkey under 21s in the Altay Alsancak Stadium in March 1993.

At the start of his career Kenny showed great promise and was thought to have the potential to become a key player for both Everton and England, with former Everton player Peter Beardsley hailing Kenny as the "Goodison Gazza".

His reputation was further enhanced when he was named man of the match in the Premier League's first ever Merseyside derby. However, Kenny's fledgling career was blighted by injury at first, and later cocaine and alcohol use. After a spell in a drying-out clinic failed to get Kenny's Everton career back on track he was released from the club for 'gross misbehaviour' by manager Mike Walker.

Kenny then joined Oldham Athletic who were being managed by former Everton striker Graeme Sharp. Kenny again struggled at Oldham, scoring an own goal in a 3–1 loss to Port Vale and was sacked after making just four league appearances for the team. Following this spell at Oldham Kenny retired from the professional game at the age of 21, although he did make further appearances in non-League football for Barrow AFC, and also played amateur football for Royal Seaforth in the Liverpool County Combination League.

== Post-career reputation ==
Because Kenny never came close to fulfilling his potential, and ended his professional career at such a young age, he is often seen as a "lost talent" of English football. Rob Smyth of the Guardian placed Kenny at number one in a list of Football's Lost Talents, while Football365 named Kenny in seventh place in their list of Football's Wasted Talents. In a 2009 article in the Guardian Kenny's short-lived career was described as "one of the biggest wastes of talent in modern times".
