= Joe Parkinson =

English footballer (born 1971)

Personal information
- Full name: Joseph Parkinson
- Date of birth: 11 June 1971 (age 55)
- Place of birth: Eccles, Salford, England
- Position: Midfielder

Senior career*
Years	Team	Apps	(Gls)
1989–1993	Wigan Athletic	119	(6)
1993	AFC Bournemouth	30	(1)
1993–1999	Everton	90	(3)
Total		239	(10)
- * Club domestic league appearances and goals

Joseph Parkinson (born 11 June 1971) is an English football coach and former professional player.

As a player, Parkinson played in the Premier League for Everton, while with the club he won the FA Cup in 1995. He also played in the Football League for Wigan Athletic and AFC Bournemouth making a total of 239 league appearances, scoring 10 goals during a ten-year career.

Parkinsons final Everton goal came in the final game of the 1995/96 season, where he slotted home to give the home side a 1-0 victory over Aston Villa.

After working away from the sport for a number of years, he returned to football in 2012 and was an academy coach at Wigan Athletic, he was promoted to assistant manager under Gary Caldwell and later joined Bury in a similar position. He has since held various roles on the coaching staff's of AFC Fylde, Shrewsbury Town and Hartlepool United.

== Playing career ==
After stints in the lower leagues with Wigan Athletic and AFC Bournemouth the combative midfielder was signed by managerless Everton on 28 December 1993 for £250,000, between the resignation of Howard Kendall and arrival of Mike Walker. While at the Premier League side he made 107 appearances, scoring 4 goals.

He became a fans' favourite at the club, playing a major part in Joe Royle's "Dogs of War" Everton team. Most memorably he won an FA Cup winner's medal when Everton defeated Manchester United in the 1995 Final.

In April 1997, Parkinson broke down after battling a knee injury most of the season, and was ruled out for the remainder of the 1996–97 season as well as the entire 1997–98 season. Parkinson was unable to return to full fitness. Complications with the injury, including 2 surgeries and a further full season out of the game (1998–99) resulted in Parkinson retiring from football in November 1999, when only 28. This came two years after his last appearance. Despite the relatively small number of appearances he made, his contribution and commitment was recognised with a testimonial against Manchester City in 2000.

== Coaching career ==
After a spell out of the game, Parkinson took up the role of youth team coach at Wigan Athletic in 2012. Joe moved from coaching the youth team to working with the first team under Gary Caldwell who won the 2015–16 Football League One title and were promoted to the Championship. In 2017, he was appointed assistant manager at Bury working under Chris Lucketti. However, following a poor run of form both his and Lucketti's contracts were terminated in January 2018.

In April 2018, Parkinson joined National League side AFC Fylde as the Lead Academy Coach. In July 2017, Parkinson moved to Shrewsbury Town where he became the club's assistant manager.

In November 2019, Parkinson left his role at Shrewsbury to take up the position of assistant manager at Hartlepool United. The role saw him link up with Dave Challinor who he had worked with previously at Fylde. Parkinson left the club in August 2021 due to health and family reasons. He described Hartlepool's promotion to League Two in the 2020–21 season as one of the biggest achievements in his career.

== Personal life ==
Parkinson was on Sky Sports show "Where Are They Now" in May 2008 where he was shown to be working as a forklift driver at "Smith Bateson". He said he got a normal day job because he just got so bored being at home all the time. Parkinson re-surfaced in a coaching role with Wigan Athletic in 2012, progressing from working with the youth team to first team coach.

In an interview for the BBC in October 2011, Joey Barton said that Joe Parkinson is his favourite footballer of all time.

== Honours ==
Everton

- FA Cup: 1994–95
- FA Charity Shield: 1995
