= Dave Watson =

English footballer (born 1961)

Personal information
- Full name: David Watson
- Date of birth: 20 November 1961 (age 64)
- Place of birth: Liverpool, England
- Height: 6 ft 0 in (1.83 m)
- Position: Centre back

Youth career
- 1978–1980: Liverpool

Senior career*
Years	Team	Apps	(Gls)
1980–1986	Norwich City	212	(11)
1986–2001	Everton	425	(23)
Total		631	(34)

International career
1983–1984	England U21	7	(1)
1984–1988	England	12	(0)

Managerial career
- 1997: Everton (caretaker)
- 2001–2002: Tranmere Rovers
- * Club domestic league appearances and goals

David Watson (born 20 November 1961) is an English football manager and former professional player.

As a player, he was a centre-back from 1980 to 2001. He played his entire career for Norwich City and Everton. He played in the Premier League for Everton and was part of their victorious FA Cup winning team of 1995. He made 12 appearances for the England national team.

In 1997, Watson had a spell in caretaker charge of Everton although he would not retire for another four years, in which he moved into coaching and was appointed first team manager at Tranmere Rovers for the 2001–2002 season. He later spent time coaching in Wigan Athletic's youth academy before taking up a similar role with Newcastle United.

== Club career ==
=== Norwich City ===
Watson played for the Liverpool reserves before joining Norwich City for £50,000 on 29 November 1980. He made his league debut in the local derby against Ipswich Town on Boxing Day that year. He played 18 league games in the 1980–81 First Division campaign and scored three goals, but was unable to prevent the Canaries from sliding into the Second Division.

Over the next five years, Watson was rarely absent from the Norwich side and helped them win promotion from the Second Division in the 1981–82 season. He eventually made 256 appearances for Norwich, and as club captain lifted the League Cup in 1985. They were demoted to the Second Division that year, but won promotion the following year as champions.

=== Everton ===
Watson moved on to play for Everton for £900,000 on 22 August 1986 after six years at Norwich. He remained at Goodison Park for 15 years, his first game for them coming on 23 August 1986 when they won 2–0 at home to Nottingham Forest on the opening day of the league season. He helped them win the league title in their first season, and also helped them reach the FA Cup final in 1989, where they lost 3–2 to local rivals Liverpool in extra time.

Watson was an integral part of the Everton side throughout the 1990s, and following the departure of goalkeeper Neville Southall in 1998 he became the club's oldest and longest serving player. However, the 1990s were a generally unsuccessful decade for Everton after the glories of the 1980s. They did finish sixth in 1990 after topping the table earlier in 1990–91, but then endured four seasons of mid table finishes, and avoided relegation in 1994 on the last day of the season. Watson captained Everton to a surprise 1–0 win over Manchester United in the 1995 FA Cup final – by now he was one of the last players remaining from Everton's last major trophy win (the league title) eight years earlier. He was man of the match for that game.

Watson captained Everton to sixth place in 1995–96, but the following season the club struggled and manager Joe Royle resigned in March 1997, with Watson taking over as manager for the final few weeks of the season and overseeing Everton's Premier League survival as they finished 15th. Howard Kendall then took over as manager for the third time, though his return to Goodison Park lasted just one season before he was replaced by Walter Smith.

Even at the age of 37, Watson was a regular in the Everton side as captain, playing 22 times in the 1998–99 season though by 1999–2000 he played just seven times all season, before calling time on 15 years at Everton and becoming manager of Tranmere Rovers on 4 May 2001. His final game for Everton was a 2–2 draw with Tottenham Hotspur on 15 January 2000.

== International career ==
Watson was capped 12 times at senior level for England. His first cap came on 10 June 1984 in a 2–0 friendly win over Brazil. By the time of his transfer from Norwich to Everton two years later, he had been capped six times for England. He won a further six England caps, bringing his tally to 12 by the time he made his final England appearance on 18 June 1988 in England's 3–1 European Championship defeat by the Soviet Union in 1988.

== Coaching and management career ==
Watson was appointed Everton manager in March 1997 for the remainder of the 1996–97 season following the resignation of Joe Royle, but reverted to his playing duties in June 1997 when Howard Kendall was appointed manager for the third and final time. Watson's first-team opportunities gradually faded, but he made one appearance for Everton during the 2000–01 season, before finally announcing his retirement as a player at the age of 39, and moving into management with Tranmere Rovers. His key objective at Tranmere was to regain their Division One status which had just been lost, but he failed to achieve that goal and was dismissed after just one season at the helm. He later became a scout for Birmingham City before joining Wigan Athletic as their youth-team coach on 23 April 2008.

In 2002, Watson was voted into the Norwich City F.C. Hall of Fame. Watson was appointed as Under 18 Coach at Newcastle United on 7 November 2011.

On 28 January 2015, Watson was brought into John Carver's backroom team at Newcastle United for the remaining 16 games of the 2014–15 season.

== Managerial statistics ==
Team	From	To	Record				
Team	From	To	G	W	D	L	Win %
Everton	1 April 1997	31 May 1997	7	1	3	3	14.29
Tranmere Rovers	4 May 2001	1 August 2002	55	22	15	18	40.00
Career Total			62	23	18	21	37.10

== Honours ==
Norwich City

- Football League Second Division: 1985–86
- Football League Cup: 1984–85

Everton

- Football League First Division: 1986–87
- FA Cup: 1994–95; runner-up: 1988–89
- FA Charity Shield: 1987, 1995
- Full Members' Cup runner-up: 1988–89, 1990–91

Individual

- Norwich City Player of the Year: 1983
- FA Cup final Man of the Match: 1995
- Norwich City Hall of Fame Inductee

Sporting positions
Preceded by Kevin Ratcliffe	Everton captain 1992–1997	Succeeded by Gary Speed
Preceded by Gary Speed	Everton captain 1998–2001	Succeeded by Kevin Campbell
