= 1994–95 FA Cup =

Tournament details
- Country: England; Wales

Final positions
- Champions: Everton (5th title)
- Runners-up: Manchester United

Tournament statistics
- Top goal scorer(s): Jürgen Klinsmann; Uwe Rösler; Matthew Le Tissier; Chris Armstrong (5 goals)

The 1994–95 FA Cup (known as the FA Cup sponsored by Littlewoods for sponsorship reasons) was the 114th staging of the FA Cup. The competition was won by Everton, with a shock victory over Manchester United, who were strong favourites to retain the title. This tournament was the 50th to be officially held since the six-year suspension due to World War II. Everton's Joe Royle would be the last English-born manager to lift the FA Cup until Harry Redknapp managed Portsmouth to the 2008 victory. As of 2026, this is the most recent major trophy won by Everton.

This was the first FA Cup season to bear a title sponsor.

== Calendar ==
Round	Initial Matches	New Entries	Clubs
Preliminary round	Saturday 27 August 1994	306	557 → 404
First round qualifying	Saturday 10 September 1994	135	404 → 260
Second round qualifying	Saturday 24 September 1994	none	260 → 188
Third round qualifying	Saturday 8 October 1994	none	188 → 152
Fourth round qualifying	Saturday 22 October 1994	20	152 → 124
First round proper	Saturday 12 November 1994	52	124 → 84
Second round proper	Saturday 3 December 1994	none	84 → 64
Third round proper	Saturday 7 January 1995	44	64 → 32
Fourth round proper	Saturday 28 January 1995	none	32 → 16
Fifth round proper	Saturday 18 February 1995	none	16 → 8
Sixth round proper	Saturday 11 March 1995	none	8 → 4
Semi-finals	Sunday 9 April 1995	none	4 → 2
Final	Saturday 20 May 1995	none	2 → 1

== Qualifying rounds ==
Most participating clubs that were not members of the Premier League or Football League competed in the qualifying rounds to secure one of 28 places available in the first round.

The winners from the fourth qualifying round were Spennymoor United, Guiseley, Altrincham, Southport, Bishop Auckland, Hyde United, Northwich Victoria, Witton Albion, Halifax Town, Slough Town, Chesham United, Enfield, Gresley Rovers, Heybridge Swifts, Chelmsford City, Hitchin Town, Yeading, Aylesbury United, Kettering Town, Worthing, Marlow, Tiverton Town, Kingstonian, Crawley Town, Walton & Hersham, Ashford Town (Kent), Newport (IOW) and Bashley.

Heybridge Swifts and Bashley were appearing in the competition proper for the first time. Of the others, Hyde United had not featured at this stage since 1983–84, Chesham United and Worthing had not done so since 1982-83, Hitchin Town had not done so since 1978-79, Walton & Hersham had not done so since 1975-76, Ashford Town (Kent) had not done so since 1974-75, Newport (IOW) had not done so since 1958-59 and Gresley Rovers had not done so since 1930-31.

Enfield and Aylesbury United both enjoyed runs through seven rounds of the tournament. Enfield defeated Hemel Hempstead, Purfleet, Ruislip Manor, St Albans City, Cardiff City and Torquay United before going out to Leicester City at Filbert Street; while Aylesbury defeated Boreham Wood, Edgware Town, Baldock Town, Moor Green, Newport (IOW) and Kingstonian before going out to Queens Park Rangers at Loftus Road. Leicester City and QPR were both in the Premier League this season.

== First round proper ==
Port Vale and Burnley from the Football League First Division entered in this round along with the 46 Second and Third Division teams, the 28 non-league clubs from the qualifying rounds and Woking, Runcorn, Kidderminster Harriers and Bath City who were given byes. Tiverton Town, from the Western League Premier Division at Step 8 of English football, was the lowest-ranked team in the draw.

The matches were played on 12 November 1994. There were eleven replays, with Bury and Bishop Auckland requiring a penalty shootout to settle their tie.

Tie no	Home team	Score	Away team	Attendance
1	Enfield (6)	1–0	Cardiff City	12 November 1994
2	Ashford Town (Kent) (7)	2–2	Fulham	12 November 1994
Replay	Fulham	5–3	Ashford Town (Kent)	22 November 1994
3	Chester City	2–0	Witton Albion (6)	12 November 1994
4	Chesterfield	0–0	Scarborough	12 November 1994
Replay	Scarborough	2–0	Chesterfield	22 November 1994
5	AFC Bournemouth	3–1	Worthing (7)	12 November 1994
6	Barnet	4–4	Woking (5)	12 November 1994
Replay	Woking	1–0	Barnet	22 November 1994
7	Bath City (5)	0–5	Bristol Rovers	12 November 1994
8	Burnley	2–1	Shrewsbury Town	12 November 1994
9	Preston North End	1–0	Blackpool	14 November 1994
10	Walsall	3–0	Rochdale	12 November 1994
11	Marlow (6)	2–0	Oxford United	13 November 1994
12	Crewe Alexandra	7–1	Gresley Rovers (6)	12 November 1994
13	Doncaster Rovers	1–4	Huddersfield Town	12 November 1994
14	Wrexham	1–0	Stockport County	12 November 1994
15	Bishop Auckland (6)	0–0	Bury	12 November 1994
Replay	Bury	1–1	Bishop Auckland	22 November 1994
Bury won 4–2 on penalties
16	Wycombe Wanderers	4–0	Chelmsford City (6)	12 November 1994
17	Kidderminster Harriers (5)	1–1	Torquay United	12 November 1994
Replay	Torquay United	1–0	Kidderminster Harriers	23 November 1994
18	Bradford City	1–1	Scunthorpe United	12 November 1994
Replay	Scunthorpe United	3–2	Bradford City	22 November 1994
19	Hull City	0–1	Lincoln City	12 November 1994
20	Altrincham (5)	3–2	Southport (5)	12 November 1994
21	Exeter City	1–0	Crawley Town (6)	12 November 1994
22	Mansfield Town	3–1	Northwich Victoria (5)	22 November 1994
23	Port Vale	6–0	Hartlepool United	12 November 1994
24	Halifax Town (5)	1–1	Runcorn (5)	12 November 1994
Replay	Runcorn	1–3	Halifax Town	21 November 1994
25	Chesham United (6)	0–1	Bashley (7)	12 November 1994
26	Kingstonian (6)	2–1	Brighton & Hove Albion	12 November 1994
27	Guiseley (6)	1–4	Carlisle United	13 November 1994 played at Valley Parade
28	York City	3–3	Rotherham United	12 November 1994
Replay	Rotherham United	3–0	York City	22 November 1994
29	Hereford United	2–2	Hitchin Town (6)	12 November 1994
Replay	Hitchin Town	4–2	Hereford United	22 November 1994
30	Kettering Town (5)	0–1	Plymouth Argyle	13 November 1994
31	Newport (IOW) (7)	2–3	Aylesbury United (6)	12 November 1994
32	Wigan Athletic	4–0	Spennymoor United (6)	12 November 1994
33	Tiverton Town (8)	1–3	Leyton Orient	12 November 1994
34	Hyde United (6)	1–3	Darlington	12 November 1994
35	Peterborough United	4–0	Northampton Town	12 November 1994
36	Birmingham City	4–0	Slough Town (6)	12 November 1994
37	Walton & Hersham (6)	0–2	Swansea City	21 November 1994
38	Cambridge United	2–2	Brentford	12 November 1994
Replay	Brentford	1–2	Cambridge United	22 November 1994
39	Heybridge Swifts (7)	0–2	Gillingham	11 November 1994
40	Yeading (6)	2–2	Colchester United	12 November 1994
Replay	Colchester United	7–1	Yeading	22 November 1994

== Second round proper ==
The second round of the competition featured the winners of the first round ties. The matches were played on 3 December 1994, with five replays and no penalty shootouts required. Bashley, from the Southern League Southern Division at Step 7 of the football pyramid, was the lowest-ranked team in the draw.

Tie no	Home team	Score	Away team	Attendance
1	Enfield (6)	1–1	Torquay United	3 December 1994
Replay	Torquay United	0–1	Enfield	13 December 1994
2	Chester City	1–2	Burnley	4 December 1994
3	Preston North End	1–1	Walsall	3 December 1994
Replay	Walsall	4–0	Preston North End	13 December 1994
4	Gillingham	1–1	Fulham	3 December 1994
Replay	Fulham	1–2	Gillingham	13 December 1994
5	Marlow (6)	2–1	Woking (5)	4 December 1994
6	Crewe Alexandra	1–2	Bury	3 December 1994
7	Lincoln City	1–0	Huddersfield Town	3 December 1994
8	Scarborough	1–0	Port Vale	3 December 1994
9	Wrexham	5–2	Rotherham United	3 December 1994
10	Plymouth Argyle	2–1	AFC Bournemouth	3 December 1994
11	Carlisle United	2–0	Darlington	4 December 1994
12	Hitchin Town (6)	0–5	Wycombe Wanderers	3 December 1994
13	Altrincham (5)	1–0	Wigan Athletic	3 December 1994
14	Exeter City	1–2	Colchester United	3 December 1994
15	Halifax Town (5)	0–0	Mansfield Town	3 December 1994
Replay	Mansfield Town	2–1	Halifax Town	13 December 1994
16	Kingstonian (6)	1–4	Aylesbury United (6)	3 December 1994
17	Peterborough United	0–2	Cambridge United	3 December 1994
18	Birmingham City	0–0	Scunthorpe United	2 December 1994
Replay	Scunthorpe United	1–2	Birmingham City	14 December 1994
19	Leyton Orient	0–2	Bristol Rovers	3 December 1994
20	Bashley (7)	0–1	Swansea City	4 December 1994

== Third round proper ==
Teams from the Premier League and the Football League First Division (except Port Vale and Burnley) entered at this stage. Matches were played on the weekend of 7-9 January 1995. Twelve replays were required, with one of those going to penalties to settle the outcome. Enfield, Marlow and Aylesbury United from the Isthmian League Premier Division at Step 6 of the football pyramid were the lowest-ranked teams in the round. Along with Altrincham from the Football Conference at Step 5, they were also the last non-league clubs left in the competition.

Tie no	Home team	Score	Away team	Attendance
1	Bristol City (2)	0–0	Stoke City (2)	7 January 1995
Replay	Stoke City	1–3	Bristol City	18 January 1995
2	Bury (4)	2–2	Tranmere Rovers (2)	7 January 1995
Replay	Tranmere Rovers	3–0	Bury	18 January 1995
3	Southampton (1)	2–0	Southend United (2)	7 January 1995
4	Reading (2)	1–3	Oldham Athletic (2)	7 January 1995
5	Walsall (4)	1–1	Leeds United (1)	7 January 1995
Replay	Leeds United	5–2	Walsall	17 January 1995
6	Gillingham (4)	1–2	Sheffield Wednesday (1)	7 January 1995
7	Leicester City (1)	2–0	Enfield (6)	7 January 1995
8	Notts County (2)	2–2	Manchester City (1)	8 January 1995
Replay	Manchester City	5–2	Notts County	18 January 1995
9	Nottingham Forest (1)	2–0	Plymouth Argyle (3)	7 January 1995
10	Grimsby Town (2)	0–1	Norwich City (1)	7 January 1995
11	Sunderland (2)	1–1	Carlisle United (4)	7 January 1995
Replay	Carlisle United	1–3	Sunderland	17 January 1995
12	Luton Town (2)	1–1	Bristol Rovers (3)	7 January 1995
Replay	Bristol Rovers	0–1	Luton Town	18 January 1995
13	Everton (1)	1–0	Derby County (2)	7 January 1995
14	Swindon Town (2)	2–0	Marlow (6)	7 January 1995
15	Scarborough (4)	0–0	Watford (2)	7 January 1995
Replay	Watford	2–0	Scarborough	17 January 1995
16	Wrexham (3)	2–1	Ipswich Town (1)	7 January 1995
17	Sheffield United (2)	0–2	Manchester United (1)	9 January 1995
18	Newcastle United (1)	1–1	Blackburn Rovers (1)	8 January 1995
Replay	Blackburn Rovers	1–2	Newcastle United	18 January 1995
19	Tottenham Hotspur (1)	3–0	Altrincham (5)	7 January 1995
20	Wycombe Wanderers (3)	0–2	West Ham United (1)	7 January 1995
21	Queens Park Rangers (1)	4–0	Aylesbury United (6)	7 January 1995
22	Barnsley (2)	0–2	Aston Villa (1)	7 January 1995
23	Coventry City (1)	1–1	West Bromwich Albion (2)	7 January 1995
Replay	West Bromwich Albion	1–2	Coventry City	18 January 1995
24	Portsmouth (2)	3–1	Bolton Wanderers (2)	7 January 1995
25	Millwall (2)	0–0	Arsenal (1)	7 January 1995
Replay	Arsenal	0–2	Millwall	18 January 1995
26	Crystal Palace (1)	5–1	Lincoln City (4)	8 January 1995
27	Chelsea (1)	3–0	Charlton Athletic (2)	7 January 1995
28	Wimbledon (1)	1–0	Colchester United (4)	7 January 1995
29	Mansfield Town (4)	2–3	Wolverhampton Wanderers (2)	7 January 1995
30	Birmingham City (3)	0–0	Liverpool (1)	7 January 1995
Replay	Liverpool	1–1	Birmingham City	18 January 1995
Liverpool won 2–0 on penalties
31	Cambridge United (3)	2–4	Burnley (2)	7 January 1995
32	Swansea City (3)	1–1	Middlesbrough (2)	7 January 1995
Replay	Middlesbrough	1–2	Swansea City	17 January 1995

== Fourth round proper ==
The fourth round featured the thirty-two winning teams from the previous round, and was played on the weekend of 28 January. There were five replays and two penalty shootouts. Second Division sides Wrexham and Swansea City were the lowest-ranked teams in the draw and the last clubs from the First Round left in the competition.

Tie no	Home team	Score	Away team	Attendance
1	Bristol City	0–1	Everton	29 January 1995
2	Burnley	0–0	Liverpool	28 January 1995
Replay	Liverpool	1–0	Burnley	7 February 1995
3	Watford	1–0	Swindon Town	28 January 1995
4	Nottingham Forest	1–2	Crystal Palace	28 January 1995
5	Sheffield Wednesday	0–0	Wolverhampton Wanderers	30 January 1995
Replay	Wolverhampton Wanderers	1–1	Sheffield Wednesday	8 February 1995
Wolverhampton Wanderers won 4–3 on penalties
6	Sunderland	1–4	Tottenham Hotspur	29 January 1995
7	Luton Town	1–1	Southampton	28 January 1995
Replay	Southampton	6–0	Luton Town	8 February 1995
8	Tranmere Rovers	0–2	Wimbledon	29 January 1995
9	Newcastle United	3–0	Swansea City	28 January 1995
10	Manchester City	1–0	Aston Villa	28 January 1995
11	Queens Park Rangers	1–0	West Ham United	28 January 1995
12	Coventry City	0–0	Norwich City	28 January 1995
Replay	Norwich City	3–1	Coventry City	8 February 1995
13	Portsmouth	0–1	Leicester City	28 January 1995
14	Manchester United	5–2	Wrexham	28 January 1995
15	Millwall	0–0	Chelsea	28 January 1995
Replay	Chelsea	1–1	Millwall	8 February 1995
Millwall won 5–4 on penalties
16	Leeds United	3–2	Oldham Athletic	28 January 1995

== Fifth round proper ==
The eight fifth round ties were played on the weekend of 18 February, with three replays being required.

Tie no	Home team	Score	Away team	Attendance
1	Liverpool	1–1	Wimbledon	19 February 1995
Replay	Wimbledon	0–2	Liverpool	28 February 1995
2	Watford	0–0	Crystal Palace	18 February 1995
Replay	Crystal Palace	1–0	Watford	1 March 1995
3	Wolverhampton Wanderers	1–0	Leicester City	18 February 1995
4	Everton	5–0	Norwich City	18 February 1995
5	Newcastle United	3–1	Manchester City	19 February 1995
6	Tottenham Hotspur	1–1	Southampton	18 February 1995
Replay	Southampton	2–6	Tottenham Hotspur	1 March 1995
7	Queens Park Rangers	1–0	Millwall	18 February 1995
8	Manchester United	3–1	Leeds United	19 February 1995

== Sixth round proper ==
The sixth round proper, or quarter-finals, ties were scheduled for the weekend of 11 March. The Crystal Palace–Wolverhampton Wanderers match went to a replay 11 days later.

Tottenham Hotspur progressed to the semi-finals of a competition that they had to appeal to compete in after being banned for financial irregularities, and their quarter-final victory over Liverpool ended their opposition's hopes of an FA Cup/League Cup double.

Wolverhampton Wanderers, the last non-Premiership side in the competition, lost 4–1 at home to Crystal Palace in a replay after a 1–1 draw in the first game.

QPR's hopes of instant success under new player-manager Ray Wilkins were ended when they were beaten 2–0 by Manchester United, one of his former clubs.

11 March 1995
15:00 GMT

Liverpool	1–2	Tottenham Hotspur
Fowler 38'	Report	Sheringham 45'; Klinsmann 89'

Anfield, Liverpool
Attendance: 39,592
Referee: Martin Bodenham

11 March 1995

Crystal Palace	1–1	Wolverhampton Wanderers
Dowie 53'		Cowans 66'

Selhurst Park, London
Attendance: 14,604
Referee: Gary Willard

12 March 1995

Everton	1–0	Newcastle United
D. Watson 66'	Report

Goodison Park, Liverpool
Attendance: 35,203
Referee: Keith Cooper

12 March 1995

Manchester United	2–0	Queens Park Rangers
Sharpe 23'; Irwin 53'

Old Trafford, Manchester
Attendance: 42,830
Referee: Dermot Gallagher

=== Replay ===
22 March 1995

Wolverhampton Wanderers	1–4	Crystal Palace
D. Kelly 34'		Armstrong 32', 67'; Dowie 37'; Pitcher 45'

Molineux, Wolverhampton
Attendance: 27,548
Referee: Gary Willard

== Semi-finals ==
Manchester United, also chasing the Premier League title, needed a replay to see off a Crystal Palace side who were battling against relegation.

Everton, meanwhile, blew apart a Tottenham side who had started the season banned from the competition for financial irregularities until an appeal saw them reinstated.

9 April 1995
13:30 BST

Tottenham Hotspur	1–4	Everton
Klinsmann 63' (pen.)	Report	Jackson 35'; Stuart 55'; Amokachi 82' 90'

Elland Road, Leeds
Attendance: 38,226
Referee: Robbie Hart

9 April 1995

Manchester United	2–2 aet	Crystal Palace
Irwin 70'; Pallister 97'	Report	Dowie 33'; Armstrong 92'

Villa Park, Birmingham
Attendance: 38,256
Referee: David Elleray

=== Replay ===
12 April 1995

Crystal Palace	0–2	Manchester United
Patterson (red card) 55'	Report	Bruce 29'; Pallister 40'; Keane (red card) 55'

Villa Park, Birmingham
Attendance: 17,987
Referee: David Elleray

== Final ==
The final was contested between Manchester United and Everton at Wembley Stadium, London on 20 May 1995. Everton won the match 1–0 through a Paul Rideout goal after half an hour. It was the first time in six years that United were left without a major trophy, while Everton had won their first major trophy in eight years.

20 May 1995
15:00

Everton	1–0	Manchester United
Rideout 30'	Report

Wembley Stadium, London
Attendance: 79,592
Referee: Gerald Ashby (Gloucestershire)

== Media coverage ==
For the seventh consecutive season in the United Kingdom, the BBC were the free to air broadcasters while Sky Sports were the subscription broadcasters.

The matches shown live on the BBC were:

• Newcastle United 1-1 Blackburn Rovers (R3)

• Sunderland 1-4 Tottenham Hotspur (R4)

• Manchester United 3-1 Leeds United (R5)

• Everton 1-0 Newcastle United (QF)

• Tottenham Hotspur 1-4 Everton (SF)

• Everton 1-0 Manchester United (Final)

The matches shown live on Sky Sports were:

• Kettering Town 0-1 Plymouth Argyle (R1)

• Preston North End 1-0 Blackpool (R1)

• Woking 1-0 Barnet (R1 Replay)

• Birmingham City 0-0 Scunthorpe United (R2)

• Chester City 1-2 Burnley (R2)

• Scunthorpe United 1-2 Birmingham City (R2 Replay)

• Sheffield United 0-2 Manchester United (R3)

• Blackburn Rovers 1-2 Newcastle United (R3 Replay)

• Sheffield Wednesday 0-0 Wolverhampton Wanderers (R4)

• Wolverhampton Wanderers 1-1 Sheffield Wednesday (R4 Replay)

• Newcastle United 3-1 Manchester City (R5)

• Southampton 2-6 Tottenham Hotspur (R5 Replay)

• Manchester United 2-0 Queens Park Rangers (QF)

• Wolverhampton Wanderers 1-4 Crystal Palace (QF Replay)

• Manchester United 2-2 Crystal Palace (SF)

• Crystal Palace 0-2 Manchester United (SF Replay)
