= 1999–2000 Everton F.C. season =

English football club season

Everton F.C.
1999–2000 season
- Chairman: Philip Carter
- Manager: Walter Smith
- Stadium: Goodison Park
- FA Premier League: 13th
- FA Cup: Quarter-final
- League Cup: Second round
- Top goalscorer: League: Kevin Campbell (12); All: Kevin Campbell (12)
- Highest home attendance: 40,056 (vs. Liverpool, 21 April)
- Lowest home attendance: 30,490 (vs. Leicester City, 3 January)
- Average home league attendance: 34,828

During the 1999–2000 English football season, Everton competed in the FA Premier League, the FA Cup, and the League Cup.

== Season summary ==
1999–2000 brought a one-place improvement upon the previous season's 14th-place finish for Everton. The season largely proved to be one of mid-table safety, with relegation never a serious threat, and a run to the quarter-finals of the FA Cup representing their best performance in the competition since they last won it in 1995, but the blue half of Merseyside was still left frustrated by their side's lack of success, something which had been a familiar scene for far too long. Manager Walter Smith, determined to address the inconsistency that had prevented Everton from doing better this season, pulled off one of the biggest transfer surprises of the close season by bringing in Paul Gascoigne and bolstering one of the most ungainly squads currently in the FA Premier League.

Off the pitch, the big story was the battle for control of the club's boardroom, with former chairman Peter Johnson finally being forced to sell his controlling interest after the Football Association threatened both Everton and Tranmere Rovers with sanctions unless he sold his shares in one of the clubs. On the eve of the new millennium, Johnson sold his shares in Everton to theatre impresario Bill Kenwright.

== Final league table ==
Pos	Team	Pld	W	D	L	GF	GA	GD	Pts
11	Newcastle United	38	14	10	14	63	54	+9	52
12	Middlesbrough	38	14	10	14	46	52	−6	52
13	Everton	38	12	14	12	59	49	+10	50
14	Coventry City	38	12	8	18	47	54	−7	44
15	Southampton	38	12	8	18	45	62	−17	44

Source: Premier League
Rules for classification: 1) points; 2) goal difference; 3) number of goals scored.

Results summary

Overall								Home						Away					
Pld	W	D	L	GF	GA	GD	Pts	W	D	L	GF	GA	GD	W	D	L	GF	GA	GD
38	12	14	12	59	49	+10	50	7	9	3	36	21	+15	5	5	9	23	28	−5

Source: 1999–2000 FA Premier League table

Results by round

Round	1	2	3	4	5	6	7	8	9	10	11	12	13	14	15	16	17	18	19	20	21	22	23	24	25	26	27	28	29	30	31	32	33	34	35	36	37	38
Ground	H	A	A	H	H	A	A	H	A	H	A	H	A	A	H	H	A	A	H	A	H	H	A	A	H	A	H	A	A	H	A	H	A	H	H	H	A	H
Result	D	L	L	W	W	L	W	W	W	D	L	D	L	D	D	D	L	W	W	D	D	D	L	W	W	W	D	D	L	L	L	W	D	W	D	L	D	L
Position	9	16	18	14	7	11	9	7	6	5	7	8	9	10	10	11	12	11	8	8	9	9	11	10	7	7	6	8	8	10	10	9	8	9	9	10	10	13

Source: 11v11.com: 1999–2000 Everton results
A = Away; H = Home; W = Win; D = Draw; L = Loss

== Results ==
Everton's score comes first

=== Legend ===
Win	Draw	Loss

=== FA Premier League ===
Date	Opponent	Venue	Result	Attendance	Scorers
8 August 1999	Manchester United	H	1–1	39,141	Stam (own goal)
11 August 1999	Aston Villa	A	0–3	30,336	
14 August 1999	Tottenham Hotspur	A	2–3	34,539	Unsworth (2 pens)
21 August 1999	Southampton	H	4–1	31,755	Gough, Lundekvam (own goal), Jeffers, Campbell
25 August 1999	Wimbledon	H	4–0	32,818	Unsworth, Barmby, Jeffers, Campbell
28 August 1999	Derby County	A	0–1	26,550	
11 September 1999	Sheffield Wednesday	A	2–0	23,539	Barmby, Gemmill
19 September 1999	West Ham United	H	1–0	35,154	Jeffers
27 September 1999	Liverpool	A	1–0	44,802	Campbell
2 October 1999	Coventry City	H	1–1	34,839	Jeffers
16 October 1999	Arsenal	A	1–4	38,042	Collins
24 October 1999	Leeds United	H	4–4	37,355	Campbell (2), Hutchison, Weir
30 October 1999	Middlesbrough	A	1–2	33,915	Campbell
7 November 1999	Newcastle United	A	1–1	36,164	Campbell
20 November 1999	Chelsea	H	1–1	38,255	Campbell
27 November 1999	Aston Villa	H	0–0	34,750	
4 December 1999	Manchester United	A	1–5	55,133	Jeffers
18 December 1999	Watford	A	3–1	17,346	Barmby, Hutchison, Unsworth (pen)
26 December 1999	Sunderland	H	5–0	40,017	Hutchison (2), Jeffers, Pembridge, Campbell
28 December 1999	Bradford City	A	0–0	18,276	
3 January 2000	Leicester City	H	2–2	30,490	Hutchison, Unsworth (pen)
15 January 2000	Tottenham Hotspur	H	2–2	36,144	Campbell, Moore
22 January 2000	Southampton	A	0–2	15,232	
6 February 2000	Wimbledon	A	3–0	13,172	Campbell (2), Moore
12 February 2000	Derby County	H	2–1	33,260	Moore, Ball (pen)
26 February 2000	West Ham United	A	4–0	26,025	Barmby (3), Moore
4 March 2000	Sheffield Wednesday	H	1–1	32,020	Weir
11 March 2000	Chelsea	A	1–1	35,113	Cadamarteri
15 March 2000	Coventry City	A	0–1	18,518	
19 March 2000	Newcastle United	H	0–2	32,512	
25 March 2000	Sunderland	A	1–2	41,934	Barmby
1 April 2000	Watford	H	4–2	31,960	M Hughes, Moore (2), S Hughes
8 April 2000	Leicester City	A	1–1	18,705	Hutchison
15 April 2000	Bradford City	H	4–0	30,646	Pembridge, Unsworth (pen), Barmby, Collins
21 April 2000	Liverpool	H	0–0	40,056	
29 April 2000	Arsenal	H	0–1	35,919	
8 May 2000	Leeds United	A	1–1	37,713	Barmby
14 May 2000	Middlesbrough	H	0–2	34,663	

=== FA Cup ===
Round	Date	Opponent	Venue	Result	Attendance	Goalscorers
R3	11 December 1999	Exeter City	A	0–0	6,045	
R3R	21 December 1999	Exeter City	H	1–0	15,345	Barmby
R4	8 January 2000	Birmingham City	H	2–0	25,405	Unsworth (2 pens)
R5	29 January 2000	Preston North End	H	2–0	37,486	Unsworth, Moore
QF	20 February 2000	Aston Villa	H	1–2	35,331	Moore

=== League Cup ===
Round	Date	Opponent	Venue	Result	Attendance	Goalscorers
R2 1st Leg	14 September 1999	Oxford United	A	1–1	7,345	Cadamarteri
R2 2nd Leg	22 September 1999	Oxford United	H	0–1 (lost 1–2 on agg)	10,006	

== Squad ==
Note: Flags indicate national team as defined under FIFA eligibility rules; some limited exceptions apply. Players may hold more than one non-FIFA nationality.

No.	Pos.	Nation	Player
1	GK	NOR	Thomas Myhre
2	DF	SCO	Alec Cleland
3	DF	ENG	Michael Ball
4	DF	SCO	Richard Gough
5	DF	ENG	Dave Watson
6	DF	ENG	David Unsworth
7	MF	SCO	John Collins
8	FW	ENG	Nick Barmby
9	FW	ENG	Kevin Campbell
10	MF	SCO	Don Hutchison
11	MF	SCO	Scot Gemmill
12	MF	WAL	Mark Pembridge
13	GK	ENG	Paul Gerrard
14	DF	SCO	David Weir
15	DF	IRL	Richard Dunne
16	FW	ENG	Danny Cadamarteri

No.	Pos.	Nation	Player
17	FW	ENG	Francis Jeffers
18	MF	ENG	Stephen Hughes
19	DF	POR	Abel Xavier
20	FW	ENG	Phil Jevons
21	MF	ENG	Mitch Ward
22	MF	DEN	Peter Degn
23	FW	USA	Joe-Max Moore
25	MF	ENG	Danny Williamson
26	FW	WAL	Mark Hughes
27	DF	ENG	Peter Clarke
31	GK	IRL	Dean Delany
34	MF	ENG	Matt McKay
35	GK	ENG	Steve Simonsen
36	MF	ENG	Jamie Milligan
37	DF	ENG	Adam Farley
38	DF	ENG	Carl Regan

=== Left club during season ===
Note: Flags indicate national team as defined under FIFA eligibility rules; some limited exceptions apply. Players may hold more than one non-FIFA nationality.

No.	Pos.	Nation	Player
18	DF	IRL	Terry Phelan (to Fulham)
19	MF	WAL	John Oster (to Sunderland)
24	MF	ENG	Tony Grant (to Manchester City)
26	FW	ENG	Tommy Johnson (on loan from Celtic)
28	DF	CRO	Slaven Bilić (to Hajduk Split)

No.	Pos.	Nation	Player
29	MF	ENG	Wayne McDermott (to Nuneaton Borough)
30	MF	IRL	Gareth Farrelly (to Bolton Wanderers)
31	FW	ENG	Michael Branch (to Wolves)
32	DF	ENG	John O'Kane (to Bolton Wanderers)
33	MF	ENG	Joe Parkinson (retired)

=== Reserve squad ===
Note: Flags indicate national team as defined under FIFA eligibility rules; some limited exceptions apply. Players may hold more than one non-FIFA nationality.

No.	Pos.	Nation	Player
-	DF	ENG	Tony Hibbert
-	DF	WAL	Craig Hogg
-	DF	ENG	George Pilkington
-	MF	ENG	Tom Kearney
-	MF	IRL	John Lester

No.	Pos.	Nation	Player
-	MF	ENG	Kevin McLeod
-	MF	ENG	Leon Osman
-	MF	ENG	Keith Southern
-	FW	ENG	Nick Chadwick

== Transfers ==
=== In ===
Date	Pos.	Name	From	Fee
14 July 1999	FW	Kevin Campbell	Trabzonspor	£3,000,000
5 August 1999	MF	Mark Pembridge	Benfica	£800,000
3 September 1999	DF	Abel Xavier	PSV Eindhoven	£1,500,000
3 December 1999	FW	Joe-Max Moore	New England Revolution	Free transfer
7 March 2000	MF	Stephen Hughes	Arsenal	£3,000,000
14 March 2000	FW	Mark Hughes	Southampton	Free transfer

=== Out ===
Date	Pos.	Name	To	Fee
22 June 1999	FW	Ibrahima Bakayoko	Marseille	£4,000,000
23 June 1999	DF	Adam Eaton	Preston North End	£5,000
29 June 1999	MF	Olivier Dacourt	Lens	£6,500,000
8 July 1999	DF	Marco Materazzi	Perugia	£3,000,000
30 July 1999	DF	Craig Short	Blackburn Rovers	£1,700,000
1 August 1999	MF	Mick O'Brien	Torquay United	Free transfer
6 August 1999	MF	David Poppleton	Lincoln City	Free transfer
6 August 1999	MF	John Oster	Sunderland	£1,000,000
10 November 1999	DF	Joe Parkinson	Retired	Free transfer
17 December 1999	DF	Wayne McDermott	Nuneaton Borough	Non-contract
17 December 1999	MF	Gareth Farrelly	Bolton Wanderers	Free transfer
23 December 1999	DF	John O'Kane	Bolton Wanderers	Free transfer
24 December 1999	MF	Tony Grant	Manchester City	£450,000
20 January 2000	FW	Michael Branch	Wolverhampton Wanderers	£500,000
2 February 2000	DF	Terry Phelan	Fulham	Free transfer
2 March 2000	DF	Slaven Bilić	Hajduk Split	Free transfer

Transfers in: ▼£8,300,000
Transfers out: ▲£17,155,000
Total spending: ▲£8,855,000

== Statistics ==
=== Starting 11 ===
Considering starts in all competitions

- GK: #13, (England) Paul Gerrard, 37
- RB: #14, (Scotland) David Weir, 42
- CB: #4, (Scotland) Richard Gough, 32
- CB: #15, (Republic of Ireland) Richard Dunne, 32
- LB: #6, (England) David Unsworth, 38
- RM: #8, (England) Nick Barmby, 42
- CM: #10, (Scotland) Don Hutchison, 34
- CM: #7, (Scotland) John Collins, 38
- LM: #12, (Wales) Mark Pembridge, 34
- CF: #9, (England) Kevin Campbell, 31
- CF: #17, (England) Francis Jeffers, 20
