= 2000–01 Everton F.C. season =

English football club season

Everton F.C.
2000–01 season
- Chairman: Philip Carter
- Manager: Walter Smith
- FA Premier League: 16th
- FA Cup: Fourth round
- League Cup: Second round
- Top goalscorer: League: Kevin Campbell (9); All: Kevin Campbell (10)
- Highest home attendance: 40,260 vs Liverpool (16 April 2001, FA Premier League)
- Lowest home attendance: 24,491 vs Southampton (14 October 2000, FA Premier League)
- Average home league attendance: 33,945
Home colours	Away colours	Third colours

During the 2000–01 season, Everton competed in the FA Premier League, the FA Cup, and the Football League Cup.

== Season summary ==
The 2000–01 season saw a major step back for Everton and the club once again fell into a relegation battle, not helped by long-term injuries to several key players. Even the arrival of Paul Gascoigne made little difference to the side, with the iconic Geordie performing like a thin shadow of his former self. In the early stages the club had looked to be heading for another season of mid-table safety, but a terrible run of form in December and January plunged them into a relegation battle that they remained embroiled in for the rest of the season, ultimately not securing safety until they beat already-relegated Bradford City in their third-to-last match. This season saw them finish 16th – their lowest finish under Smith's management. The cups offered no respite, with the club suffering a humiliating fourth-round FA Cup exit to Merseyside neighbours Tranmere Rovers, who were struggling at the foot of Division One.

In March 2000 American cable television provider NTL approached the club with a view to purchasing a 9.9% stake in the club. Everton expected to announce a deal before the beginning of the 2000–01 season, but by October 2000 any chance of an agreement had disappeared leaving Everton with financial difficulties and forced to sell first team players, including Youth Academy products Francis Jeffers and Michael Ball, to balance the books – the board had already spent £18.4 million on purchasing new players including bringing back Duncan Ferguson, on the basis that an agreement was in place. Around the same time Paul Gregg had been negotiating a deal with United News and Media but this never came to completion.

== Final league table ==
Pos	Team	Pld	W	D	L	GF	GA	GD	Pts	Qualification or relegation
14	Middlesbrough	38	9	15	14	44	44	0	42	
15	West Ham United	38	10	12	16	45	50	−5	42	
16	Everton	38	11	9	18	45	59	−14	42	
17	Derby County	38	10	12	16	37	59	−22	42	
18	Manchester City (R)	38	8	10	20	41	65	−24	34	Relegation to the Football League First Division

Source: Premier League
Rules for classification: 1) points; 2) goal difference; 3) number of goals scored.
(R) Relegated

Results summary

Overall								Home						Away					
Pld	W	D	L	GF	GA	GD	Pts	W	D	L	GF	GA	GD	W	D	L	GF	GA	GD
38	11	9	18	45	59	−14	42	6	8	5	29	27	+2	5	1	13	16	32	−16

Source: 2000–01 FA Premier League table

Results by round

Round	1	2	3	4	5	6	7	8	9	10	11	12	13	14	15	16	17	18	19	20	21	22	23	24	25	26	27	28	29	30	31	32	33	34	35	36	37	38
Ground	A	H	H	A	A	H	A	H	H	A	A	H	A	H	H	A	A	H	A	H	A	H	A	H	A	H	H	A	H	A	A	H	A	H	A	H	A	H
Result	L	W	D	L	W	L	D	L	D	W	L	L	W	W	W	L	L	D	L	L	L	D	W	D	L	D	W	L	D	L	W	W	L	L	L	W	L	D
Position	19	7	7	10	7	10	11	13	17	12	14	15	14	12	11	13	14	14	14	14	16	16	15	15	15	15	15	15	16	16	15	14	15	15	16	14	15	16

Source: 11v11.com: 2000–01 Everton results
A = Away; H = Home; W = Win; D = Draw; L = Loss

== Results ==
Everton's score comes first

=== Legend ===
Win	Draw	Loss

=== FA Premier League ===
Date	Opponent	Venue	Result	Attendance	Scorers
19 August 2000	Leeds United	A	0–2	40,010	
23 August 2000	Charlton Athletic	H	3–0	36,300	Jeffers, Ferguson (2)
26 August 2000	Derby County	H	2–2	34,840	Jeffers, Gravesen
5 September 2000	Tottenham Hotspur	A	2–3	35,316	Jeffers, Nyarko
9 September 2000	Middlesbrough	A	2–1	30,885	Jeffers (2)
16 September 2000	Manchester United	H	1–3	38,541	Gravesen
24 September 2000	Leicester City	A	1–1	18,084	Unsworth
30 September 2000	Ipswich Town	H	0–3	32,597	
14 October 2000	Southampton	H	1–1	24,491	Ball
21 October 2000	Newcastle United	A	1–0	51,625	Campbell
29 October 2000	Liverpool	A	1–3	44,718	Campbell
5 November 2000	Aston Villa	H	0–1	27,370	
11 November 2000	Bradford City	A	1–0	17,276	Naysmith
18 November 2000	Arsenal	H	2–0	33,106	Cadamarteri, Campbell
25 November 2000	Chelsea	H	2–1	33,516	Cadamarteri, Campbell
4 December 2000	Sunderland	A	0–2	46,372	
9 December 2000	Manchester City	A	0–5	34,516	
16 December 2000	West Ham United	H	1–1	31,260	Cadamarteri
23 December 2000	Charlton Athletic	A	0–1	20,042	
26 December 2000	Coventry City	H	1–2	35,704	Gemmill
1 January 2001	Derby County	A	0–1	27,358	
13 January 2001	Tottenham Hotspur	H	0–0	32,290	
20 January 2001	Coventry City	A	3–1	19,174	Gemmill, Cadamarteri, Campbell
31 January 2001	Middlesbrough	H	2–2	34,244	Naysmith, Tal
3 February 2001	Manchester United	A	0–1	67,528	
7 February 2001	Leeds United	H	2–2	34,224	Ferguson, Campbell
10 February 2001	Leicester City	H	2–1	30,407	Jeffers, Campbell
24 February 2001	Ipswich Town	A	0–2	22,220	
3 March 2001	Newcastle United	H	1–1	35,779	Unsworth
17 March 2001	Southampton	A	0–1	15,251	
31 March 2001	West Ham United	A	2–0	26,044	Unsworth (pen), Alexandersson
8 April 2001	Manchester City	H	3–1	36,561	Ferguson, Ball, Weir
14 April 2001	Aston Villa	A	1–2	31,272	Unsworth
16 April 2001	Liverpool	H	2–3	40,260	Ferguson, Unsworth (pen)
21 April 2001	Arsenal	A	1–4	38,029	Campbell
28 April 2001	Bradford City	H	2–1	34,256	Ferguson, Alexandersson
5 May 2001	Chelsea	A	1–2	35,196	Campbell
19 May 2001	Sunderland	H	2–2	37,444	Tal, Ball

=== FA Cup ===
Round	Date	Opponent	Venue	Result	Attendance	Goalscorers
R3	6 January 2001	Watford	A	2–1	15,645	Hughes, Watson
R4	27 January 2001	Tranmere Rovers	H	0–3	39,207	

=== League Cup ===
Round	Date	Opponent	Venue	Result	Attendance	Goalscorers
R2 1st Leg	20 September 2000	Bristol Rovers	H	1–1	25,564	Campbell
R2 2nd Leg	27 September 2000	Bristol Rovers	A	1–1 (lost 2–4 on pens)	11,045	Jeffers

== Squad ==
Note: Flags indicate national team as defined under FIFA eligibility rules; some limited exceptions apply. Players may hold more than one non-FIFA nationality.

No.	Pos.	Nation	Player
1	GK	ENG	Paul Gerrard
2	DF	ENG	Steve Watson
3	DF	ITA	Alessandro Pistone
4	DF	SCO	Richard Gough (captain)
5	DF	SCO	David Weir
6	DF	ENG	David Unsworth
7	MF	SWE	Niclas Alexandersson
8	MF	GHA	Alex Nyarko
9	FW	ENG	Kevin Campbell
10	MF	ENG	Stephen Hughes
11	MF	WAL	Mark Pembridge
12	DF	ENG	Michael Ball
13	GK	ENG	Steve Simonsen
14	FW	ENG	Francis Jeffers
15	DF	SCO	Gary Naysmith
16	MF	DEN	Thomas Gravesen

No.	Pos.	Nation	Player
17	MF	SCO	Scot Gemmill
18	MF	ENG	Paul Gascoigne
19	FW	USA	Joe-Max Moore
20	DF	SCO	Alec Cleland
21	FW	ENG	Danny Cadamarteri
22	DF	ENG	Dave Watson (captain)
24	FW	SCO	Duncan Ferguson
25	DF	DEN	Peter Degn
26	FW	ENG	Phil Jevons
28	DF	POR	Abel Xavier
29	MF	ENG	Kevin McLeod
30	DF	ENG	Peter Clarke
31	MF	ENG	Leon Osman
32	DF	ENG	Tony Hibbert
33	MF	ISR	Idan Tal
35	GK	NOR	Thomas Myhre

=== Left club during season ===
Note: Flags indicate national team as defined under FIFA eligibility rules; some limited exceptions apply. Players may hold more than one non-FIFA nationality.

No.	Pos.	Nation	Player
15	DF	IRL	Richard Dunne (to Manchester City)
23	FW	WAL	Mark Hughes (to Blackburn Rovers)

No.	Pos.	Nation	Player
27	MF	ENG	Jamie Milligan (to Blackpool)

=== Reserve squad ===
Note: Flags indicate national team as defined under FIFA eligibility rules; some limited exceptions apply. Players may hold more than one non-FIFA nationality.

No.	Pos.	Nation	Player
—	GK	ENG	Andy Pettinger
—	DF	ENG	Anthony Gerrard
—	DF	ENG	Sean O'Hanlon
—	DF	ENG	George Pilkington
—	DF	WAL	Michael Price
—	DF	WAL	Ryan Valentine
—	MF	AUS	David Carney
—	MF	ENG	Sean Doherty

No.	Pos.	Nation	Player
—	MF	ENG	Tom Kearney
—	MF	IRL	John Lester
—	MF	ENG	Matt McKay
—	MF	ENG	Steven Schumacher
—	MF	ENG	Keith Southern
—	FW	ENG	Nick Chadwick
—	FW	ENG	Wayne Rooney
—	FW	ENG	Michael Symes

== Transfers ==
=== In ===
Date	Pos	Name	From	Fee	Notes
30 June 2000	DF	Alessandro Pistone	Newcastle United	£3,000,000	
1 July 2000	GK	Andy Pettinger	Scunthorpe United	£45,000	
4 July 2000	DF	Steve Watson	Aston Villa	£2,500,000	
13 July 2000	MF	Alex Nyarko	RC Lens	£4,500,000	
17 July 2000	MF	Paul Gascoigne	Middlesbrough	Free transfer	
19 July 2000	MF	Niclas Alexandersson	Sheffield Wednesday	£2,500,000	
24 July 2000	MF	Thomas Gravesen	Hamburg	£2,500,000	
17 August 2000	FW	Duncan Ferguson	Newcastle United	£3,750,000	
17 October 2000	DF	Gary Naysmith	Hearts	£1,500,000	
17 October 2000	MF	Idan Tal	Maccabi Petah Tikva	£700,000	

=== Out ===
Date	Pos	Name	To	Fee	Notes
9 June 2000	GK	Dean Delany	Port Vale	Free transfer	
15 June 2000	DF	Carl Regan	Barnsley	Free transfer	
13 July 2000	MF	Mitch Ward	Barnsley	£200,000	
14 July 2000	MF	Don Hutchison	Sunderland	£2,500,000	
14 July 2000	MF	John Collins	Fulham	£2,000,000	
18 July 2000	MF	Nick Barmby	Liverpool	£6,000,000	
16 October 2000	DF	Richard Dunne	Manchester City	£3,000,000	
24 October 2000	MF	Mark Hughes	Blackburn Rovers	Free transfer	
21 March 2001	MF	Jamie Milligan	Blackpool	Free transfer	

Transfers in: ▼£20,995,000
Transfers out: ▲£13,700,000
Total spending: ▼£7,295,000

== Statistics ==
=== Starting 11 ===
Considering starts in all competitions

- GK: #1, (England) Paul Gerrard, 34
- RB: #2, (England) Steve Watson, 38
- CB: #5, (Scotland) David Weir, 39
- CB: #6, (England) David Unsworth, 20
- LB: #12, (England) Michael Ball, 32
- RM: #7, (Sweden) Niclas Alexandersson, 20
- CM: #16, (Denmark) Thomas Gravesen, 33
- LM: #11, (Wales) Mark Pembridge, 22
- CM: #17, (Scotland) Scot Gemmill, 26
- CF: #9, (England) Kevin Campbell, 29
- CF: #14, (England) Francis Jeffers, 12 (#8, (Ghana) Alex Nyarko, has 21 starts as a central midfielder)
