= 2001–02 Everton F.C. season =

English football club season

Everton
2001–02 season
- Chairman: Philip Carter
- Manager: Walter Smith (until 13 March 2002); David Moyes (from 14 March 2002)
- Stadium: Goodison Park
- Premiership: 15th
- FA Cup: Fifth Round
- League Cup: Second Round
- Top goalscorer: League: Duncan Ferguson, Tomasz Radzinski (6); All: Duncan Ferguson (8)
- Average home league attendance: 34,004

During the 2001–02 English football season, Everton competed in the FA Premier League.

== Season summary ==
In what had become a depressingly familiar pattern for the Goodison Park faithful, the 2001–02 season saw encouraging form early on, followed by a disastrous run of results after Christmas Day, plunging the Toffees deep into relegation trouble. The Everton directors finally lost patience with Walter Smith when they sacked him on 13 March, after being knocked out by Middlesbrough in the FA Cup quarter-final, with only one win in 13 league games which left Everton one point above the relegation zone. Former Preston boss David Moyes was appointed as his successor, and did a good job of steering Everton clear of the drop zone, finishing 15th in the table.

== Kit ==
Everton retained the previous season's home kit, manufactured by Puma and sponsored by one2one. The away kit was Silver and the third kit was pink with black sleeves. Both away and third kits had black shorts.

== Final league table ==
Pos	Team	Pld	W	D	L	GF	GA	GD	Pts	Qualification or relegation
13	Fulham	38	10	14	14	36	44	−8	44	Qualification for the Intertoto Cup second round
14	Charlton Athletic	38	10	14	14	38	49	−11	44	
15	Everton	38	11	10	17	45	57	−12	43	
16	Bolton Wanderers	38	9	13	16	44	62	−18	40	
17	Sunderland	38	10	10	18	29	51	−22	40	

Source: Premier League
Rules for classification: 1) points; 2) goal difference; 3) number of goals scored.

Results summary

Overall								Home						Away					
Pld	W	D	L	GF	GA	GD	Pts	W	D	L	GF	GA	GD	W	D	L	GF	GA	GD
38	11	10	17	45	57	−12	43	8	4	7	26	23	+3	3	6	10	19	34	−15

Source: Statto

Results by round

Round	1	2	3	4	5	6	7	8	9	10	11	12	13	14	15	16	17	18	19	20	21	22	23	24	25	26	27	28	29	30	31	32	33	34	35	36	37	38
Ground	A	H	H	A	H	A	H	A	H	H	A	H	A	H	A	H	A	A	H	H	A	H	A	A	H	H	A	H	A	H	A	A	H	A	H	A	H	A
Result	W	D	W	L	L	L	W	D	W	L	D	D	D	W	L	W	L	L	L	L	L	W	D	D	L	L	D	D	L	W	W	L	W	L	D	W	L	L
Position	4	1	1	5	7	11	7	10	8	10	11	12	12	9	11	9	9	9	13	13	13	13	13	12	14	15	16	15	15	15	13	13	12	13	13	11	13	15

Source: Statto.com
A = Away; H = Home; W = Win; D = Draw; L = Loss

== Results ==
Everton's score comes first

=== Legend ===
Win	Draw	Loss

=== FA Premier League ===
Date	Opponent	Venue	Result	Attendance	Scorers
18 August 2001	Charlton Athletic	A	2–1	20,451	Ferguson (pen), Weir
20 August 2001	Tottenham Hotspur	H	1–1	29,503	Ferguson (pen)
25 August 2001	Middlesbrough	H	2–0	32,829	Campbell, Gemmill
8 September 2001	Manchester United	A	1–4	67,534	Campbell
15 September 2001	Liverpool	H	1–3	39,554	Campbell
22 September 2001	Blackburn Rovers	A	0–1	27,732	
29 September 2001	West Ham United	H	5–0	32,049	Campbell, Hutchison (own goal), Gravesen, Watson, Radzinski
13 October 2001	Ipswich Town	A	0–0	22,820	
20 October 2001	Aston Villa	H	3–2	33,352	Watson, Radzinski, Gravesen
27 October 2001	Newcastle United	H	1–3	37,524	Weir
3 November 2001	Bolton Wanderers	A	2–2	27,343	Stubbs, Gascoigne
18 November 2001	Chelsea	H	0–0	30,555	
24 November 2001	Leicester City	A	0–0	21,539	
2 December 2001	Southampton	H	2–0	28,138	Radzinski, Pembridge
8 December 2001	Fulham	A	0–2	19,338	
15 December 2001	Derby County	H	1–0	38,615	Moore
19 December 2001	Leeds United	A	2–3	40,201	Moore, Weir
22 December 2001	Sunderland	A	0–1	48,013	
26 December 2001	Manchester United	H	0–2	39,948	
29 December 2001	Charlton Athletic	H	0–3	31,131	
1 January 2002	Middlesbrough	A	0–1	27,463	
12 January 2002	Sunderland	H	1–0	30,736	Blomqvist
19 January 2002	Tottenham Hotspur	A	1–1	36,056	Weir
30 January 2002	Aston Villa	A	0–0	32,460	
2 February 2002	Ipswich Town	H	1–2	33,069	Unsworth (pen)
10 February 2002	Arsenal	H	0–1	30,859	
23 February 2002	Liverpool	A	1–1	44,371	Radzinski
3 March 2002	Leeds United	H	0–0	33,226	
6 March 2002	West Ham United	A	0–1	29,883	
16 March 2002	Fulham	H	2–1	34,639	Unsworth, Ferguson
23 March 2002	Derby County	A	4–3	33,297	Unsworth, Stubbs, Alexandersson, Ferguson
29 March 2002	Newcastle United	A	2–6	51,921	Ferguson, Alexandersson
1 April 2002	Bolton Wanderers	H	3–1	39,784	Pistone, Radzinski, Chadwick
6 April 2002	Chelsea	A	0–3	40,545	
13 April 2002	Leicester City	H	2–2	35,580	Chadwick, Ferguson
20 April 2002	Southampton	A	1–0	31,785	Watson
28 April 2002	Blackburn Rovers	H	1–2	34,976	Chadwick
11 May 2002	Arsenal	A	3–4	38,254	Carsley, Radzinski, Watson

=== FA Cup ===
Round	Date	Opponent	Venue	Result	Attendance	Goalscorers
R3	5 January 2002	Stoke City	A	1–0	28,218	Stubbs
R4	26 January 2002	Leyton Orient	H	4–1	35,851	McGhee (own goal), Ferguson, Campbell (2)
R5	17 February 2002	Crewe Alexandra	H	0–0	29,399	
R5R	26 February 2002	Crewe Alexandra	A	2–1	10,073	Radzinski, Campbell
QF	10 March 2002	Middlesbrough	A	0–3	26,950	

=== League Cup ===
Round	Date	Opponent	Venue	Result	Attendance	Goalscorers
R2	12 September 2001	Crystal Palace	H	1–1 (lost 4–5 on pens)	21,128	Ferguson (pen)

== Squad ==
Note: Flags indicate national team as defined under FIFA eligibility rules; some limited exceptions apply. Players may hold more than one non-FIFA nationality.

No.	Pos.	Nation	Player
1	GK	ENG	Paul Gerrard
2	MF	ENG	Steve Watson
3	DF	ITA	Alessandro Pistone
4	DF	ENG	Alan Stubbs
5	DF	SCO	David Weir
6	DF	ENG	David Unsworth
7	MF	SWE	Niclas Alexandersson
8	FW	CAN	Tomasz Radzinski
9	FW	ENG	Kevin Campbell (captain)
10	FW	SCO	Duncan Ferguson
11	MF	WAL	Mark Pembridge
12	MF	SWE	Jesper Blomqvist
13	GK	ENG	Steve Simonsen
14	MF	ISR	Idan Tal

No.	Pos.	Nation	Player
15	DF	SCO	Gary Naysmith
16	MF	DEN	Thomas Gravesen
17	MF	SCO	Scot Gemmill
18	FW	ENG	Wayne Rooney
19	FW	USA	Joe-Max Moore
20	DF	SCO	Alec Cleland
22	MF	SWE	Tobias Linderoth
24	MF	FRA	David Ginola
25	GK	ENG	Andy Pettinger
26	MF	IRL	Lee Carsley
27	DF	ENG	Peter Clarke
28	DF	ENG	Tony Hibbert
29	MF	ENG	Kevin McLeod
30	MF	ENG	Nick Chadwick

=== Left club during season ===
Note: Flags indicate national team as defined under FIFA eligibility rules; some limited exceptions apply. Players may hold more than one non-FIFA nationality.

No.	Pos.	Nation	Player
12	DF	ENG	Michael Ball (to Rangers)
18	MF	ENG	Paul Gascoigne (to Burnley)
21	FW	ENG	Danny Cadamarteri (to Bradford City)
24	DF	POR	Abel Xavier (to Liverpool)
25	MF	DEN	Peter Degn (to Brøndby)

No.	Pos.	Nation	Player
26	GK	NOR	Thomas Myhre (to Beşiktaş J.K.)
—	MF	GHA	Alex Nyarko (on loan to AS Monaco)
—	MF	ENG	Tom Kearney (to Bradford City)
—	MF	ENG	Matt McKay (retired)

=== Reserve squad ===
Note: Flags indicate national team as defined under FIFA eligibility rules; some limited exceptions apply. Players may hold more than one non-FIFA nationality.

No.	Pos.	Nation	Player
—	DF	ENG	Anthony Gerrard
—	DF	ENG	George Pilkington
—	DF	WAL	Ryan Valentine
—	MF	AUS	David Carney
—	MF	ENG	Scott Brown

No.	Pos.	Nation	Player
—	MF	ENG	Leon Osman
—	MF	ENG	Steven Schumacher
—	MF	ENG	Keith Southern
—	FW	ENG	David Eaton
—	FW	ENG	Michael Symes

== Transfers ==
=== In ===
Date	Pos	Name	From	Fee
5 July 2001	DF	Alan Stubbs	Celtic	Free
17 July 2001	FW	Tomasz Radzinski	Anderlecht	£4,500,000
8 November 2001	MF	Jesper Blomqvist	Manchester United	Free
31 January 2002	MF	Tobias Linderoth	Stabæk	£2,500,000
8 February 2002	MF	David Ginola	Aston Villa	Free
8 February 2002	MF	Lee Carsley	Coventry City	£1,900,000

=== Out ===
Date	Pos	Name	To	Fee
4 July 2001	MF	Stephen Hughes	Watford	Free
6 July 2001	FW	Phil Jevons	Grimsby Town	£250,000
20 July 2001	MF	Peter Degn	Brøndby	Nominal
17 August 2001	DF	Michael Ball	Rangers	£6,500,000
15 November 2001	GK	Thomas Myhre	Beşiktaş	£375,000
30 January 2002	DF	Abel Xavier	Liverpool	£800,000
21 February 2002	FW	Danny Cadamarteri	Bradford City	Free
17 March 2002	MF	Paul Gascoigne	Burnley	Free
21 March 2002	DF	Tom Kearney	Bradford City	Free

Transfers in: ▼£8,900,000
Transfers out: ▲£7,925,000
Total spending: ▼£975,000

== Statistics ==
=== Starting 11 ===
Considering starts in all competitions

- GK: #13, (England) Steve Simonsen, 25
- RB: #2, (England) Steve Watson, 24
- CB: #5, (Scotland) David Weir, 36
- CB: #4, (England) Alan Stubbs, 29
- LB: #3, (Italy) Alessandro Pistone, 25
- RM: #7, (Sweden) Niclas Alexandersson, 28
- CM: #17, (Scotland) Scot Gemmill, 31
- CM: #16, (Denmark) Thomas Gravesen, 22
- LM: #6, (England) David Unsworth, 28
- CF: #8, (Canada) Tomasz Radzinski, 23
- CF: #9, (England) Kevin Campbell, 21
