= 1998–99 Everton F.C. season =

English football club season

Everton F.C.
1998–99 season
- Chairman: Peter Johnson (until December 1998); Philip Carter (from December 1998)
- Manager: Walter Smith
- Stadium: Goodison Park
- FA Premier League: 14th
- FA Cup: Sixth Round
- League Cup: Fourth Round
- Top goalscorer: League: Kevin Campbell (9); All: Kevin Campbell (9)
- Highest home attendance: 40,185 vs. Liverpool (17 October 1998)
- Lowest home attendance: 18,718 vs. Huddersfield Town (23 September 1998)
- Average home league attendance: 36,203

During the 1998–99 English football season, Everton F.C. competed in the FA Premier League.

== Season summary ==
Everton continued to look a shadow of their former selves after Howard Kendall made way for new manager Walter Smith, though their 14th-place finish was a three-place improvement upon last season's near miss with relegation. With Smith having achieved so much success north of the border with Rangers, he had been expected to bring some success to the blue half of Merseyside after two seasons of misery, but there was little for the Goodison Park faithful to shout about.

Off the field during the season in December, there was a chairmanship change in the boardroom when Peter Johnson quit after 11 years with the club following a row with manager Smith after Johnson controversially sold Duncan Ferguson to Newcastle United for £7m and Philip Carter took over the reins.

== Final league table ==
| Pos | Team | Pld | W | D | L | GF | GA | GD | Pts | Qualification or relegation |
|---|---|---|---|---|---|---|---|---|---|---|
| 12 | Sheffield Wednesday | 38 | 13 | 7 | 18 | 41 | 42 | −1 | 46 | |
| 13 | Newcastle United | 38 | 11 | 13 | 14 | 48 | 54 | −6 | 46 | Qualification for the UEFA Cup first round (Note: As Manchester United qualified for the Champions League, their UEFA Cup place as FA Cup winners defaulted to Newcastle United, the runners-up.) |
| 14 | Everton | 38 | 11 | 10 | 17 | 42 | 47 | −5 | 43 | |
| 15 | Coventry City | 38 | 11 | 9 | 18 | 39 | 51 | −12 | 42 | |
| 16 | Wimbledon | 38 | 10 | 12 | 16 | 40 | 63 | −23 | 42 | |

Source: Premier League
Rules for classification: 1) points; 2) goal difference; 3) number of goals scored.
Notes:

Results summary

| Overall | | | | | | | | Home | | | | | | Away | | | | | |
| Pld | W | D | L | GF | GA | GD | Pts | W | D | L | GF | GA | GD | W | D | L | GF | GA | GD |
|---|---|---|---|---|---|---|---|---|---|---|---|---|---|---|---|---|---|---|---|
| 38 | 11 | 10 | 17 | 42 | 47 | −5 | 43 | 6 | 8 | 5 | 22 | 12 | +10 | 5 | 2 | 12 | 20 | 35 | −15 |

Source: 1998-99 FA Premier League table

Results by round

| Round | 1 | 2 | 3 | 4 | 5 | 6 | 7 | 8 | 9 | 10 | 11 | 12 | 13 | 14 | 15 | 16 | 17 | 18 | 19 | 20 | 21 | 22 | 23 | 24 | 25 | 26 | 27 | 28 | 29 | 30 | 31 | 32 | 33 | 34 | 35 | 36 | 37 | 38 |
|---|---|---|---|---|---|---|---|---|---|---|---|---|---|---|---|---|---|---|---|---|---|---|---|---|---|---|---|---|---|---|---|---|---|---|---|---|---|---|
| Ground | H | A | H | A | H | A | H | A | H | A | H | A | A | H | A | H | H | A | H | A | H | A | H | A | H | A | H | A | H | A | A | H | H | A | H | A | H | A |
| Result | D | L | L | W | D | D | D | W | D | D | L | L | L | W | W | D | W | L | D | L | D | L | L | L | W | L | D | W | L | L | L | L | W | W | W | L | W | L |
| Position | 6 | 18 | 19 | 12 | 17 | 15 | 15 | 14 | 12 | 15 | 15 | 15 | 17 | 16 | 14 | 14 | 14 | 15 | 14 | 14 | 14 | 15 | 15 | 17 | 15 | 15 | 15 | 15 | 16 | 16 | 17 | 18 | 16 | 15 | 14 | 15 | 14 | 14 |

Source: 11v11.com: 1998-99 Everton results
A = Away; H = Home; W = Win; D = Draw; L = Loss

== Results ==
Everton's score comes first

=== Legend ===
| Win | Draw | Loss |

=== FA Premier League ===
| Date | Opponent | Venue | Result | Attendance | Scorers |
|---|---|---|---|---|---|
| 15 August 1998 | Aston Villa | H | 0–0 | 40,112 | |
| 22 August 1998 | Leicester City | A | 0–2 | 21,037 | |
| 29 August 1998 | Tottenham Hotspur | H | 0–1 | 39,378 | |
| 8 September 1998 | Nottingham Forest | A | 2–0 | 25,610 | Ferguson (2) |
| 12 September 1998 | Leeds United | H | 0–0 | 36,687 | |
| 19 September 1998 | Middlesbrough | A | 2–2 | 34,563 | Ball (pen), Collins |
| 26 September 1998 | Blackburn Rovers | H | 0–0 | 36,404 | |
| 3 October 1998 | Wimbledon | A | 2–1 | 16,054 | Cadamarteri, Ferguson |
| 17 October 1998 | Liverpool | H | 0–0 | 40,185 | |
| 24 October 1998 | Sheffield Wednesday | A | 0–0 | 26,592 | |
| 31 October 1998 | Manchester United | H | 1–4 | 40,079 | Ferguson |
| 8 November 1998 | Arsenal | A | 0–1 | 38,088 | |
| 15 November 1998 | Coventry City | A | 0–3 | 19,290 | |
| 23 November 1998 | Newcastle United | H | 1–0 | 30,357 | Ball (pen) |
| 28 November 1998 | Charlton Athletic | A | 2–1 | 20,043 | Cadamarteri (2) |
| 5 December 1998 | Chelsea | H | 0–0 | 36,430 | |
| 12 December 1998 | Southampton | H | 1–0 | 33,073 | Bakayako |
| 19 December 1998 | West Ham United | A | 1–2 | 25,998 | Cadamarteri |
| 26 December 1998 | Derby County | H | 0–0 | 39,206 | |
| 28 December 1998 | Tottenham Hotspur | A | 1–4 | 36,053 | Bakayako |
| 9 January 1999 | Leicester City | H | 0–0 | 32,792 | |
| 18 January 1999 | Aston Villa | A | 0–3 | 32,488 | |
| 30 January 1999 | Nottingham Forest | H | 0–1 | 34,175 | |
| 7 February 1999 | Derby County | A | 1–2 | 27,603 | Barmby |
| 17 February 1999 | Middlesbrough | H | 5–0 | 31,606 | Barmby (2), Dacourt, Unsworth, Materazzi |
| 20 February 1999 | Leeds United | A | 0–1 | 36,344 | |
| 27 February 1999 | Wimbledon | H | 1–1 | 32,574 | Jeffers |
| 10 March 1999 | Blackburn Rovers | A | 2–1 | 27,219 | Bakayako (2) |
| 13 March 1999 | Arsenal | H | 0–2 | 38,049 | |
| 21 March 1999 | Manchester United | A | 1–3 | 55,182 | Hutchison |
| 3 April 1999 | Liverpool | A | 2–3 | 44,852 | Dacourt, Jeffers |
| 5 April 1999 | Sheffield Wednesday | H | 1–2 | 35,270 | Jeffers |
| 11 April 1999 | Coventry City | H | 2–0 | 32,341 | Campbell (2) |
| 17 April 1999 | Newcastle United | A | 3–1 | 36,755 | Campbell (2), Gemmill |
| 24 April 1999 | Charlton Athletic | H | 4–1 | 40,089 | Hutchison, Campbell (2), Jeffers |
| 1 May 1999 | Chelsea | A | 1–3 | 34,909 | Jeffers |
| 8 May 1999 | West Ham United | H | 6–0 | 40,049 | Campbell (3), Ball, Hutchison, Jeffers |
| 16 May 1999 | Southampton | A | 0–2 | 15,254 | |

=== FA Cup ===
| Round | Date | Opponent | Venue | Result | Attendance | Goalscorers |
|---|---|---|---|---|---|---|
| R3 | 2 January 1999 | Bristol City | A | 2–0 | 19,608 | Bakayako (2) |
| R4 | 23 January 1999 | Ipswich Town | H | 1–0 | | |
| R5 | 13 February 1999 | Coventry City | H | 2–1 | 33,097 | Jeffers, Oster |
| QF | 7 March 1999 | Newcastle United | A | 1–4 | 36,584 | Unsworth |

=== League Cup ===
| Round | Date | Opponent | Venue | Result | Attendance | Goalscorers |
|---|---|---|---|---|---|---|
| R2 1st Leg | 15 September 1998 | Huddersfield Town | A | 1–1 | 15,395 | Watson |
| R2 2nd Leg | 23 September 1998 | Huddersfield Town | H | 2–1 | 18,718 | Dacourt, Materazzi |
| R3 | 28 October 1998 | Middlesbrough | A | 3–2 (a.e.t.) | 20,748 | Ferguson, Bakayako, Hutchison |
| R4 | 11 November 1998 | Sunderland | H | 1–1 (lost 4–5 on pens) | 28,312 | Collins |

== First-team squad ==
Squad at end of season

Note: Flags indicate national team as defined under FIFA eligibility rules; some limited exceptions apply. Players may hold more than one non-FIFA nationality.

| No. | Pos. | Nation | Player |
|---|---|---|---|
| 1 | GK | NOR | Thomas Myhre |
| 2 | DF | SCO | Alec Cleland |
| 3 | DF | ENG | Michael Ball |
| 4 | MF | FRA | Olivier Dacourt |
| 5 | DF | ENG | Dave Watson |
| 6 | DF | ENG | David Unsworth |
| 7 | MF | SCO | John Collins |
| 9 | FW | ENG | Kevin Campbell (on loan from Trabzonspor) |
| 10 | MF | SCO | Don Hutchison |
| 11 | MF | SCO | Scot Gemmill |
| 12 | DF | ENG | Craig Short |
| 13 | GK | ENG | Paul Gerrard |
| 14 | MF | ENG | Tony Grant |
| 15 | DF | ITA | Marco Materazzi |
| 16 | FW | ENG | Michael Branch |
| 17 | MF | IRL | Gareth Farrelly |
| 18 | DF | SCO | David Weir |
| 19 | MF | WAL | John Oster |

| No. | Pos. | Nation | Player |
|---|---|---|---|
| 21 | MF | ENG | Mitch Ward |
| 22 | MF | DEN | Peter Degn |
| 24 | MF | ENG | Matt McKay |
| 25 | MF | ENG | Danny Williamson |
| 26 | FW | CIV | Ibrahima Bakayoko |
| 27 | DF | IRL | Richard Dunne |
| 28 | DF | CRO | Slaven Bilić |
| 29 | FW | ENG | Danny Cadamarteri |
| 30 | FW | ENG | Phil Jevons |
| 31 | DF | IRL | Terry Phelan |
| 32 | DF | ENG | John O'Kane |
| 33 | MF | ENG | Joe Parkinson |
| 34 | FW | ENG | Francis Jeffers |
| 35 | GK | ENG | Steve Simonsen |
| 36 | MF | ENG | Jamie Milligan |
| 37 | DF | ENG | Adam Farley |
| 38 | DF | ENG | Carl Regan |
| 39 | MF | ENG | Wayne McDermott |

=== Left club during season ===
Note: Flags indicate national team as defined under FIFA eligibility rules; some limited exceptions apply. Players may hold more than one non-FIFA nationality.

| No. | Pos. | Nation | Player |
|---|---|---|---|
| 9 | FW | SCO | Duncan Ferguson (to Newcastle United) |
| 11 | FW | SCO | John Spencer (to Motherwell) |
| 18 | FW | FRA | Mickaël Madar (to Paris Saint-Germain) |
| 20 | DF | ENG | Tony Thomas (to Motherwell) |

| No. | Pos. | Nation | Player |
|---|---|---|---|
| 22 | MF | ENG | Gavin McCann (to Sunderland) |
| 23 | DF | ENG | Carl Tiler (to Charlton Athletic) |
| 26 | DF | ENG | Graham Allen (to Tranmere Rovers) |

=== Reserve squad ===
Note: Flags indicate national team as defined under FIFA eligibility rules; some limited exceptions apply. Players may hold more than one non-FIFA nationality.

| No. | Pos. | Nation | Player |
|---|---|---|---|
| — | GK | IRL | Dean Delany |
| — | DF | ENG | Peter Clarke |
| — | DF | ENG | Adam Eaton |
| — | DF | ENG | Tony Hibbert |
| — | DF | ENG | George Pilkington |

| No. | Pos. | Nation | Player |
|---|---|---|---|
| — | MF | ENG | Kevin McLeod |
| — | MF | ENG | Mick O'Brien |
| — | MF | ENG | Leon Osman |
| — | MF | ENG | Keith Southern |
| — | MF | IRL | Gary Dempsey |

== Statistics ==
=== Appearances, goals and cards ===
(Starting appearances + substitute appearances)

| No. | Pos. | Name | League | | FA Cup | | League Cup | | Total | | Discipline | |
| No. | Pos. | Name | Apps | Goals | Apps | Goals | Apps | Goals | Apps | Goals | Yellow card | Red card |
|---|---|---|---|---|---|---|---|---|---|---|---|---|
| 1 | GK | (Norway) Thomas Myhre | 38 | 0 | 4 | 0 | 3 | 0 | 45 | 0 | 3 | 0 |
| 2 | DF | (Scotland) Alec Cleland | 16+2 | 0 | 1 | 0 | 2+1 | 0 | 19+3 | 0 | 3 | 1 |
| 3 | DF | (England) Michael Ball | 36+1 | 3 | 3 | 0 | 3+1 | 0 | 42+2 | 3 | 9 | 0 |
| 4 | MF | (France) Olivier Dacourt | 28+2 | 2 | 2 | 0 | 4 | 1 | 34+2 | 3 | 16 | 1 |
| 5 | DF | (England) Dave Watson | 22 | 0 | 3 | 0 | 1 | 1 | 26 | 1 | 0 | 0 |
| 6 | DF | (England) David Unsworth | 33+1 | 1 | 3 | 1 | 3 | 0 | 39+1 | 2 | 9 | 0 |
| 7 | MF | (Scotland) John Collins | 19+1 | 1 | 0 | 0 | 2+2 | 1 | 21+3 | 2 | 4 | 0 |
| 8 | MF | (England) Nick Barmby | 2 | 3 | 0 | 0 | 0 | 0 | 2 | 3 | 0 | 0 |
| 9 | FW | (England) Kevin Campbell | 8 | 9 | 0 | 0 | 0 | 0 | 8 | 9 | 1 | 0 |
| 9 | FW | (Scotland) Duncan Ferguson | 13 | 4 | 0 | 0 | 4 | 1 | 17 | 5 | 5 | 0 |
| 10 | MF | (Scotland) Don Hutchison | 29+4 | 3 | 4 | 0 | 3+1 | 1 | 36+5 | 4 | 11 | 1 |
| 11 | MF | (Scotland) Scot Gemmill | 7 | 1 | 0 | 0 | 0 | 0 | 7 | 1 | 3 | 0 |
| 11 | FW | (Scotland) John Spencer | 2+1 | 0 | 0 | 0 | 0 | 0 | 2+1 | 0 | 0 | 0 |
| 12 | DF | (England) Craig Short | 22 | 0 | 0 | 0 | 2 | 0 | 24 | 0 | 5 | 0 |
| 13 | GK | (England) Paul Gerrard | 0 | 0 | 0 | 0 | 1 | 0 | 1 | 0 | 0 | 0 |
| 14 | MF | (England) Tony Grant | 13+3 | 0 | 3+1 | 0 | 1+1 | 0 | 17+5 | 0 | 0 | 0 |
| 15 | DF | (Italy) Marco Materazzi | 26+1 | 1 | 2 | 0 | 4 | 1 | 32+1 | 2 | 10 | 3 |
| 16 | FW | (England) Michael Branch | 1+6 | 0 | 0+2 | 0 | 0 | 0 | 1+8 | 0 | 0 | 0 |
| 17 | MF | (Republic of Ireland) Gareth Farrelly | 0+1 | 0 | 0 | 0 | 0 | 0 | 0+1 | 0 | 0 | 0 |
| 18 | FW | (France) Mickaël Madar | 2 | 0 | 0 | 0 | 0+1 | 0 | 2+1 | 0 | 0 | 0 |
| 18 | DF | (Scotland) David Weir | 11+3 | 0 | 1 | 0 | 0 | 0 | 12+3 | 0 | 2 | 0 |
| 19 | MF | (Wales) John Oster | 6+3 | 0 | 2+2 | 1 | 1+1 | 0 | 9+6 | 1 | 1 | 0 |
| 20 | DF | (England) Tony Thomas | 0+1 | 0 | 0 | 0 | 0 | 0 | 0+1 | 0 | 0 | 0 |
| 21 | MF | (England) Mitch Ward | 4+2 | 0 | 2 | 0 | 1 | 0 | 7+2 | 0 | 2 | 0 |
| 22 | MF | (Denmark) Peter Degn | 0+4 | 0 | 0 | 0 | 0 | 0 | 0+4 | 0 | 0 | 0 |
| 23 | DF | (England) Carl Tiler | 2 | 0 | 0 | 0 | 1 | 0 | 3 | 0 | 1 | 0 |
| 26 | FW | (Ivory Coast) Ibrahima Bakayoko | 17+6 | 4 | 1+2 | 2 | 2 | 1 | 20+8 | 7 | 3 | 0 |
| 27 | DF | (Republic of Ireland) Richard Dunne | 15+1 | 0 | 2 | 0 | 2 | 0 | 19+1 | 0 | 7 | 1 |
| 28 | MF | (Croatia) Slaven Bilić | 4 | 0 | 1 | 0 | 0 | 0 | 5 | 0 | 2 | 0 |
| 29 | FW | (England) Danny Cadamarteri | 11+19 | 4 | 3+1 | 0 | 3+1 | 0 | 17+21 | 4 | 8 | 0 |
| 30 | FW | (England) Phil Jevons | 0+1 | 0 | 0 | 0 | 0 | 0 | 0+1 | 0 | 0 | 0 |
| 32 | DF | (England) John O'Kane | 2 | 0 | 1+2 | 0 | 0 | 0 | 3+2 | 0 | 0 | 0 |
| 34 | FW | (England) Francis Jeffers | 11+4 | 6 | 2 | 1 | 0 | 0 | 13+4 | 7 | 0 | 0 |
| 35 | GK | (England) Steve Simonsen | 0 | 0 | 0 | 0 | 0 | 0 | 0 | 0 | 0 | 0 |
| 36 | MF | (England) Jamie Milligan | 0+3 | 0 | 0 | 0 | 0 | 0 | 0+3 | 0 | 0 | 0 |
| 37 | DF | (England) Adam Farley | 0+1 | 0 | 0 | 0 | 0 | 0 | 0+1 | 0 | 0 | 0 |

=== Starting 11 ===
Considering starts in all competitions

- GK: #1, (Norway) Thomas Myhre, 45
- RB: #12, (England) Craig Short, 24
- CB: #15, (Italy) Marco Materazzi, 32
- CB: #5, (England) Dave Watson, 26
- LB: #6, (England) David Unsworth, 39
- RM: #7, (Scotland) John Collins, 21
- CM: #10, (Scotland) Don Hutchison, 36
- CM: #4, (France) Olivier Dacourt, 34
- LM: #3, (England) Michael Ball, 42
- CF: #26, (Ivory Coast) Ibrahima Bakayoko, 20
- CF: #29, (England) Danny Cadamarteri, 17
