= Abel Xavier =

Portuguese football manager and former player

Personal information
- Full name: Abel Luís da Silva Costa Xavier
- Date of birth: 30 November 1972 (age 53)
- Place of birth: Nampula, Mozambique
- Height: 1.89 m (6 ft 2 in)
- Position: Right-back

Senior career*
Years	Team	Apps	(Gls)
1990–1993	Estrela da Amadora	86	(5)
1993–1995	Benfica	46	(4)
1995–1996	→ Bari (loan)	8	(0)
1996–1998	Real Oviedo	59	(0)
1998–1999	PSV	19	(2)
1999–2002	Everton	43	(0)
2002–2003	Liverpool	14	(1)
2003	→ Galatasaray (loan)	11	(0)
2003–2004	Hannover 96	5	(0)
2005	Roma	3	(0)
2005–2007	Middlesbrough	18	(1)
2007–2008	LA Galaxy	20	(0)
Total		332	(13)

International career
1988–1989	Portugal U16	14	(1)
1989	Portugal U17	6	(0)
1988–1990	Portugal U18	9	(0)
1990–1991	Portugal U20	9	(0)
1991–1994	Portugal U21	21	(1)
1993–2002	Portugal	20	(2)

Managerial career
- 2013: Olhanense
- 2014–2015: Farense
- 2015: Aves
- 2016–2019: Mozambique
Medal record
Men's football
Representing Portugal
UEFA European Championship
Bronze medal – third place	2000 Belgium-Netherlands
FIFA U-20 World Cup
Winner	1991 Portugal
UEFA European Under-21 Championship
Runner-up	1994 France
FIFA U-17 World Cup
Third place	1989 Scotland
UEFA European Under-17 Championship
Winner	1989 Denmark
- * Club domestic league appearances and goals

Abel Luís da Silva Costa Xavier (Portuguese pronunciation: [ɐˈβɛl ʃɐviˈɛɾ]; born 30 November 1972) is a Portuguese football manager and former professional footballer who played as a right-back.

Xavier played for clubs in Portugal, Italy, Spain, the Netherlands, England, Turkey and Germany before retiring with the LA Galaxy of Major League Soccer (MLS) in 2008. He represented both Merseyside rivals Everton and Liverpool in the Premier League. While at Middlesbrough he was the first Premier League player to test positive for performance-enhancing substances, and was banned for one year.

From his debut in 1993, Xavier played 20 games for the Portugal national team, and was selected in their squads for UEFA Euro 2000 and 2002 FIFA World Cup. He later became a manager for several Portuguese clubs and the Mozambique national team.

== Club career ==
=== Early career ===
Xavier debuted in the Portuguese top division with Estrela da Amadora. His play there earned him a transfer to Lisbon club Benfica. He helped Benfica win the Portuguese league in 1994, and a season after, he moved to Serie A side Bari. This stint with the Italian club started a series of transfers across Europe: in 1996, Xavier was sent to Real Oviedo, then after two seasons he moved to PSV.

=== Everton and Liverpool ===
Xavier joined English Premier League club Everton in September 1999 on a £1.5 million transfer deal. He was sold to Everton's Merseyside rivals Liverpool on 30 January 2002 for £800,000. He was signed to bolster Liverpool's defence following Markus Babbel's absence through illness. Xavier scored on his Liverpool debut against Ipswich Town. He also scored against Bayer Leverkusen in the UEFA Champions League. Liverpool ended the 2001–02 FA Premier League season as runners-up to Arsenal.

Xavier started the first four league games of the 2002–03 FA Premier League season but later argued with Liverpool manager Gérard Houllier and did not feature in any of the remaining games, though he did play in a League Cup tie against Ipswich in December. On 29 January 2003, he was loaned to Turkish side Galatasaray for the remainder of the season, with an option of a permanent move in the summer. Galatasaray did not take up the option to sign Xavier, who subsequently played for Hannover 96 (2003–04) and Roma in 2004–05.

=== Middlesbrough ===
At the start of the 2005–06 season, Xavier was without a club but at the end of August, he signed for Middlesbrough to replace Michael Reiziger after the Dutchman was sold to PSV.

Following the UEFA Cup tie against Skoda Xanthi on 29 September, Xavier was administered a drugs test and failed. On 23 November 2005, he was found guilty of using the anabolic steroid methandrostenolone (also known as dianabol), and banned from professional football for 18 months. He said that the substance came from anti-virus medicine that he had imported from the United States. While other players had failed tests for recreational substances, Xavier became the first Premier League player to be found guilty of using performance-enhancing drugs. The suspension caused him to miss Middlesbrough's run to the 2006 UEFA Cup final. Xavier remained employed by the club and unsuccessfully appealed the decision; in January 2006 he said that he would take UEFA to the Court of Arbitration for Sport.

Xavier's ban was shortened to 12 months in June 2006, making him eligible to play again from November 2006. In the summer of 2006, he began training again with Middlesbrough, and on 8 November 2006, was offered a contract with the club for the remainder of the 2006–07 season. He scored his first Boro goal on 20 January 2007 in a 5–1 win against Bolton Wanderers at the Riverside Stadium.

=== LA Galaxy ===
On 14 May 2007, it was announced that Xavier was to join the LA Galaxy of Major League Soccer (MLS). He played in his first game with the Galaxy on 17 June 2007 at home against Real Salt Lake, setting up fellow new signing Edson Buddle in a 3–2 win.

Xavier was waived by Los Angeles on 18 July 2008. Later, in an interview to an online football site, Xavier criticised Galaxy manager Ruud Gullit and the league itself. In December 2009, Xavier quit professional football.

== International career ==
Xavier was a part of the Portugal squad which came third at the 1989 FIFA U-16 World Championship in Scotland.

Xavier's full international debut for senior team came on 31 March 1993, away in Switzerland in qualification for the 1994 FIFA World Cup. He played three more matches in the unsuccessful qualification campaign that year and did not play for Portugal again until 1998.

Xavier was selected for UEFA Euro 2000 and became one of the key figures in the competition, not only due to playing some of his best football but also due to a distinctly bleached-blonde hairstyle with a matching beard. In the semi-final against France, he went from close to hero, as France goalkeeper Fabien Barthez blocked what looked a sure goal, to a villain, when he deflected a shot by Sylvain Wiltord near the post in the dying seconds of golden goal extra time with his hand. Zinedine Zidane scored the penalty and put France in the final. Xavier was initially given a nine-month ban from football for his vociferous protests against referee Günter Benkö's decision to award the penalty, but it was eventually reduced to six months. In the 2002 World Cup, he was part of the squad but played only as a substitute in the final group stage match against South Korea in his final of 20 international appearances.

== Managerial career ==
In July 2013, Xavier signed to be manager of Portuguese top division club Olhanense for the upcoming 2013–14 Primeira Liga season. He was sacked by the club on 28 October 2013, despite beating Arouca in his last match to reach 11th in the table.

In December 2014, Xavier signed for another team from the Algarve, Farense of the Segunda Liga. He left his position on 28 May, after leading his team to the 11th position.

In July 2015, Xavier signed a one-year deal with another team in the second division, Desportivo das Aves. He was fired in early September after a series of poor results.

On 26 January 2016, he signed a two-year contract as coach of the Mozambique national team, starting work on 1 February. In December 2017, with his contract due to expire, he had it extended until the 2019 Africa Cup of Nations. After conceding an added-time goal to Guinea, the Black Mambas missed out on the tournament in Egypt but he was assured of a new deal by the Mozambican Football Federation; this offer was rescinded after a poor performance at the 2019 COSAFA Cup in South Africa.

== Personal life ==
Xavier was born in Mozambique, which was then a Portuguese colony, and moved to Portugal as a child. He settled in Jamor in the western suburbs of Lisbon, where he lived in poverty. He grew up in a strict Catholic background. On retiring from his playing career, Xavier converted to Islam. He said that he was initiated into the faith by a brother of the monarch of the United Arab Emirates in 2009, who gave him the name Faisal. Xavier said "You can call me Abel, you can call me Faisal or Abel ‘Faisal’ Xavier. Deep down, I wanted to keep the same name, but be recognised by a historical name in Islam".

From 2011 to 2014, Xavier was in a relationship with actress Oceana Basílio. In February 2017, with debts of €1.5 million, bankruptcy proceedings were initiated against him.

== Career statistics ==
=== Club ===
Appearances and goals by club, season and competition
Club	Season	League			National cup (Note: Includes Taça de Portugal, Copa del Rey, KNVB Cup, FA Cup, Turkish Cup, Coppa Italia, U.S. Open Cup)		League cup (Note: Includes Football League Cup)		Continental		Other		Total	
Club	Season	Division	Apps	Goals	Apps	Goals	Apps	Goals	Apps	Goals	Apps	Goals	Apps	Goals
Estrela Amadora	1989–90	Primeira Divisão	1	0	0	0	—		—		—		1	0
Estrela Amadora	1990–91	Primeira Divisão	22	0	1	0	—		3 (Note: Appearances in European Cup Winners' Cup)	0	0	0	26	0
Estrela Amadora	1991–92	Segunda Divisão	29	0	1	0	—		—		—		30	0
Estrela Amadora	1992–93	Segunda Divisão	34	5	5	2	—		—		—		39	7
Estrela Amadora	Total		86	5	7	2	—		3	0	0	0	96	7
Benfica	1993–94	Primeira Liga	24	1	0	0	—		8	1	1 (Note: Appearance(s) in Supertaça Cândido de Oliveira)	0	33	2
Benfica	1994–95	Primeira Liga	22	3	2	0	—		5 (Note: Appearances in UEFA Champions League)	0	3	0	32	3
Benfica	Total		46	4	2	0	—		13	1	4	0	65	5
Bari	1995–96	Serie A	8	0	0	0	—		—		—		8	0
Real Oviedo	1996–97	La Liga	27	0	4	0	—		—		—		31	0
Real Oviedo	1997–98	La Liga	32	0	1	0	—		—		–		33	0
Real Oviedo	Total		59	0	5	0	—		—		—		64	0
PSV	1998–99	Eredivisie	19	2	0	0	—		7	0	1 (Note: Appearance in Johan Cruyff Shield)	0	27	2
Everton	1999–2000	Premier League	20	0	2	0	1	0	—		—		23	0
Everton	2000–01	Premier League	11	0	1	0	0	0	—		—		12	0
Everton	2001–02	Premier League	12	0	1	0	1	0	—		—		14	0
Everton	Total		43	0	4	0	2	0	—		—		49	0
Liverpool	2001–02	Premier League	10	1	—		—		5	1	—		15	2
Liverpool	2002–03	Premier League	4	0	0	0	1	0	0	0	1 (Note: Appearance in FA Community Shield)	0	6	0
Liverpool	Total		14	1	0	0	1	0	5	1	1	0	21	2
Galatasaray (loan)	2002–03	Süper Lig	11	0	1	0	—		—		—		12	0
Hannover	2003–04	Bundesliga	5	0	0	0	—		—		—		5	0
Roma	2004–05	Serie A	3	0	1	0	—		0	0	—		4	0
Middlesbrough	2005–06	Premier League	4	0	—		—		2 (Note: Appearances in UEFA Cup)	0	—		6	0
Middlesbrough	2006–07	Premier League	14	1	6	0	0	0	—		—		20	1
Middlesbrough	Total		18	1	6	0	0	0	2	0	—		26	1
LA Galaxy	2007	Major League Soccer	10	0	1	0	—		5 (Note: Appearances in North American SuperLiga)	0	—		16	0
LA Galaxy	2008	Major League Soccer	10	0	—		—		—		—		10	0
LA Galaxy	Total		20	0	1	0	—		5	0	—		26	0
Career total			332	13	27	2	3	0	35	2	6	0	403	17

=== International ===
Appearances and goals by national team and year
National team	Year	Apps	Goals
Portugal	1993	4	0
Portugal	1998	5	0
Portugal	1999	2	1
Portugal	2000	4	1
Portugal	2001	2	0
Portugal	2002	3	0
Total		20	2

Scores and results list Portugal's goal tally first, score column indicates score after each Xavier goal.

List of international goals scored by Abel Xavier
No.	Date	Venue	Opponent	Score	Result	Competition
1	14 October 1998	Tehelné pole, Bratislava, Slovakia	Slovakia	3–0	3–0	Euro 2000 qualifying
2	9 October 1999	Estádio da Luz (1954), Lisbon, Portugal	Hungary	3–0	3–0	Euro 2000 qualifying

=== Managerial ===
As of 23 March 2019

Team	From	To	Record					
Team	From	To	G	W	D	L	Win %	Ref.
Olhanense	7 July 2013	28 October 2013	10	3	2	5	30.00	
Farense	1 December 2014	28 May 2015	27	11	6	10	40.74	
Desportivo Aves	9 July 2015	4 September 2015	6	0	2	4	0.00	
Mozambique	26 January 2016	22 July 2019	13	4	5	4	30.77	
Total			56	18	15	23	32.14	—

== Honours ==
Estrela da Amadora

- Segunda Liga: 1992–93

Benfica

- Primeira Liga: 1993–94
- Supertaça Cândido de Oliveira runner-up: 1994

PSV

- Johan Cruijff Shield: 1998

Liverpool

- Football League Cup: 2002–03

Portugal U17

- UEFA European Under-16 Championship: 1989
- FIFA U-16 World Cup third-place: 1989

Portugal U18

- UEFA Under-18 Championship runner-up: 1990

Portugal U20

- FIFA U-20 World Cup: 1991

== See also ==
- List of doping cases in sport
