= Francis Jeffers =

English association football player and coach (born 1981)

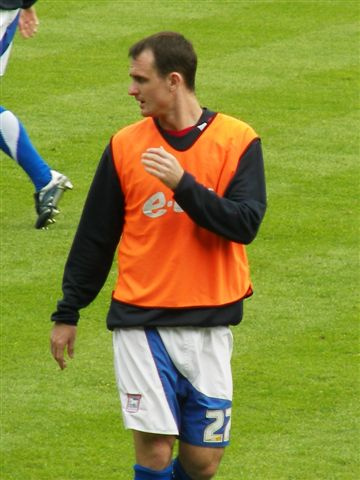
- Jeffers warming up for Ipswich Town in 2007

Personal information
- Full name: Francis Jeffers
- Date of birth: 25 January 1981 (age 45)
- Place of birth: Liverpool, England
- Height: 5 ft 9 in (1.75 m)
- Position: Striker

Team information
- Current team: Macclesfield (Assistant manager)

Youth career
- –1997: Everton

Senior career*
Years	Team	Apps	(Gls)
1997–2001	Everton	49	(18)
2001–2004	Arsenal	22	(4)
2003–2004	→ Everton (loan)	18	(0)
2004–2006	Charlton Athletic	20	(3)
2005	→ Rangers (loan)	8	(0)
2006–2007	Blackburn Rovers	10	(0)
2007	→ Ipswich Town (loan)	9	(4)
2007–2010	Sheffield Wednesday	54	(5)
2010–2011	Newcastle Jets	9	(1)
2011	Motherwell	10	(1)
2011–2012	Newcastle Jets	17	(1)
2012	Floriana	2	(1)
2013	Accrington Stanley	7	(2)
Total		235	(40)

International career
- England U15
- England U16
1999–2003	England U21	16	(13)
2003	England	1	(1)
- * Club domestic league appearances and goals

Francis Jeffers (born 25 January 1981) is an English football coach and former player, who is currently assistant manager of Macclesfield FC.

Jeffers started his career at his boyhood club Everton, making his debut in 1997 as a 16-year-old. After scoring 20 goals in 60 appearances for Everton, he signed for Arsenal in 2001. In 2004, Jeffers joined Charlton Athletic, where he spent two seasons, including spending time on loan at Scottish club Rangers. He moved to Blackburn Rovers in 2006, spending one season at the Lancashire club, whilst also spending time out on loan at Ipswich Town in 2007. He joined Sheffield Wednesday in 2007. He spent three seasons at Wednesday, making 60 appearances for the club. He left Sheffield Wednesday in 2010, moving to Australian side Newcastle Jets. He left Newcastle Jets to move to Scottish club Motherwell in 2011, before returning to Australia to rejoin Newcastle Jets in October 2011. After leaving Newcastle Jets in 2012, he joined Maltese side Floriana. He returned to England in 2013 to join Accrington Stanley, before retiring from football after leaving Accrington in 2013.

He represented England at U15, U16, and U21 levels, becoming the joint-top scorer of the England U21 team after scoring 13 goals in 16 appearances, a record which he held up until 2020. In February 2003, Jeffers made his senior debut for the England national team, scoring against Australia in his one senior cap for England.

Following his retirement from playing, he returned to Everton as a coach at the club's academy in 2014, later becoming a coach with the club's U23 side in 2018. He left Everton in May 2021 to join Ipswich Town as a first-team coach, a role he held until December. In September 2022 he joined National League side Oldham Athletic as first-team coach with additional responsibility for overseeing the introduction of the club's new B-team.

== Early life ==
Jeffers was born in Liverpool, Merseyside, and attended De La Salle School in Croxteth.

== Club career ==
=== Everton ===
Jeffers began his career at Everton, making his first-team debut as a half-time substitute for Dave Watson on 26 December 1997 at Old Trafford at the age of 16 years. Jeffers won the FA Youth Cup of 1997–98 against Blackburn Rovers with Everton. He scored 6 goals in 28 matches for Everton in the 1999–2000 season.

Jeffers started the 2000–01 season brightly, but his season was cut short with multiple ankle and shoulder injuries. When he did feature, he performed well, and his goal to game ratio was the best at the club that season. This earned Jeffers a new contract offer from the club. However, after months of negotiations, Jeffers informed the club he was rejecting the new contract.

=== Arsenal ===
His performances had caught the eye of Arsène Wenger, and Jeffers signed for Arsenal on 14 June 2001 for an initial £8 million fee, with another £2 million dependent on appearances. However, Jeffers did not live up to the "fox in the box" tag, and his time at Arsenal was dogged by injury. He was forced out of the team by the form of fellow strikers like Thierry Henry and Sylvain Wiltord. Arsenal won the FA Cup in 2002 and 2003 but Jeffers was left out of both match day squads, the latter due to injury. He contributed to their 2003 triumph by scoring three goals en route to the final; two against Farnborough and one against Chelsea. He also started the semi-final against Sheffield United. Arsenal also won the 2001–02 Premier League title, but Jeffers only made six league appearances that season. He was an unused substitute on the day Arsenal clinched the title against Manchester United at Old Trafford. His final appearance for Arsenal came in the 2003 FA Community Shield, coming on as a substitute but then getting sent off against Manchester United.

=== Return to Everton, Charlton and Rangers loan ===
On 1 September 2003, Jeffers rejoined Everton on loan for 2003–04. He only scored twice (with both goals coming against Fulham in the FA Cup; once in the original tie and again in the replay) in 22 appearances for his team, before falling out with manager David Moyes and prematurely returning to London. He signed for Arsenal's Premier League rivals Charlton Athletic on 10 August 2004 on a two-year contract for a £2.6 million fee. In 2004–05, he scored 5 goals in 24 appearances. He joined Rangers on loan on 31 August 2005 for six months but returned on 29 December after his performances in the Scottish Premier League failed to live up to expectations.

Charlton released Jeffers at the end of the 2005–06 season.

=== Blackburn Rovers ===
Jeffers signed for Blackburn Rovers in June 2006 on a two-year contract. He scored his first and only Blackburn goal in the UEFA Cup against Basel. He found his chances limited by the form of Benni McCarthy and Shabani Nonda.

He joined Championship team Ipswich Town on a one-month loan deal in March 2007, scoring his first goal for Ipswich on his full debut away at Hull City and receiving the man of the match award. Ipswich went on to win 5–2. He returned to Blackburn after suffering a hamstring injury against Southend United, but having made a quick recovery, he was allowed to return to Ipswich on loan until the end of the 2006–07 season.

Ipswich had tried to negotiate a permanent move for Jeffers but after having two bids rejected, Ipswich chairman David Sheepshanks accused Blackburn of holding his club to ransom. Ipswich did, however, make a third and final bid for Jeffers but personal terms could not be agreed.

=== Sheffield Wednesday ===
On 9 August 2007, he joined Sheffield Wednesday on a three-year contract for an undisclosed fee. Jeffers made his debut in an opening-day 4–1 defeat at Ipswich Town. He sustained an injury which kept him out of action for all but 20 minutes of the first month of the 2007–08 season.

After a lively start against Stoke City on 20 October 2007, Jeffers was on the end of a tackle from Ryan Shawcross and was stretchered off with ankle ligament damage. He was out for roughly seven weeks. Jeffers came back as a substitute on 10 December 2007 versus Hull City, but ended up on the losing team after a 1–0 loss. Just 48 hours later, Jeffers played at Hillsborough for the first time in two months, and not only played for 45 minutes of the match, but also scored the winning goal after 82 minutes from the penalty spot. This was Jeffers' second goal for Wednesday.

In the summer of 2008, Jeffers had more problems with his ankle and also picked up a groin injury, leaving him injured until September 2008. He returned to first-team action with a 25-minute substitute appearance in a 6–0 defeat at Reading in mid September 2008 and then a further ten minutes against his former club Ipswich Town. Jeffers scored his third goal for the Wednesday on 17 January 2009 in a 4–1 win over Charlton at Hillsborough, but was sent off in the next match against Nottingham Forest for a foul on Joe Heath.

On 25 August 2009, Jeffers was sent off for headbutting Port Vale player Tommy Fraser during the 2–0 League Cup defeat. Manager Brian Laws considered his behaviour unacceptable, fined the player the maximum permissible amount and placed him on the transfer list.

Jeffers was released by Wednesday on 3 May 2010 after the club's relegation to League One was confirmed. After being released by Wednesday, Jeffers had a trial at newly promoted Blackpool. Ian Holloway wanted to give Jeffers a chance to prove himself but the trial proved to be unsuccessful and he was released. He then returned to Everton, but only to join in with training at Finch Farm in a bid to keep his fitness levels up.

=== Newcastle Jets ===
After unsuccessful trials at Blackpool and Everton, Jeffers agreed to trial with Australian A-League club Newcastle Jets. On 29 October 2010, he signed a 10-match guest contract with the club. He made his debut for the club on 13 November 2010, helping Newcastle to a 3–1 victory over Adelaide United.

He scored his first goal on 8 December 2010 against the Melbourne Heart. Although Newcastle and Jeffers were both keen on extending his contract, they failed to come to an agreement and Jeffers left the club after making a positive impact.

=== Motherwell ===
In February 2011, Jeffers joined Scottish Premier League club Motherwell. He made his debut coming on as a second-half substitute for John Sutton in the 6–0 defeat to former club Rangers. His first goal for Motherwell came against Aberdeen on 15 February 2011. Jeffers also scored the third goal in a 3–0 win against Dundee United in the Scottish Cup quarter-final replay. He was part of the squad that reached the 2011 Scottish Cup Final, in which Motherwell finished runners up. Jeffers was released by Motherwell on 1 June 2011.

=== Return to Newcastle Jets ===
On 20 October 2011, he signed a one-year contract with A-League club Newcastle Jets, marking his return to the club he had played for during the 2010–11 A-League season. Jeffers scored 4 goals in 25 appearances for the A-League club. Subsequently, Newcastle Jets decided not to renew Jeffers' contract making him a free agent.

=== Floriana ===
On 12 October 2012, Jeffers signed for 26-time Maltese Premier League winners Floriana. After only two appearances and one goal, Jeffers left the club. Jeffers was then involved in a minor Twitter scandal as a fake Twitter account posing to be Jeffers claimed that the Maltese League was the worst he had ever played in.

=== Accrington Stanley ===
On 8 March 2013, Jeffers signed for League Two club Accrington Stanley until the end of the season. On 9 March 2013, Jeffers made his Accrington debut as a second-half substitute away to Northampton Town. On 20 March 2013, Jeffers scored his first two Accrington Stanley goals in a 4–0 win at home to AFC Wimbledon. He was released by Accrington at the end of the season, and had trials with Bury, Brunei DPMM of the S.League, and Chester, but none chose to sign him.

== International career ==
Jeffers was the joint top scorer for England under-21s with 13 goals from 16 appearances, a record he shared with Alan Shearer, until Eddie Nketiah broke the record in October 2020. He was previously capped by the schools, under-15 and under-16 teams.

Jeffers has one cap for the England national team, scoring a consolation goal in a defeat by Australia in a friendly on 12 February 2003.

== Coaching career ==
Unable to find a new club after his playing contract with Accrington Stanley had expired, Jeffers began working for Everton's academy on a voluntary basis in 2014. He formally joined the academy's coaching team in October 2016. Jeffers became a coach for Everton's under-23 side in 2018, working alongside former teammate David Unsworth. He was also part of Duncan Ferguson's back room staff during his spell as caretaker manager of Everton in 2019.

On 11 May 2021, Jeffers left his role at Everton to join Paul Cook's coaching staff at Ipswich Town, taking on a role as first-team coach. Jeffers departed Ipswich in December 2021 following the sacking of Cook as manager.

Jeffers was appointed as first-team coach at National League side Oldham Athletic on 23 September 2022 following the appointment of his former Everton colleague David Unsworth as the club's manager. The club announced that it also intended to introduce a B-team and that Jeffers would oversee that operation as it was implemented. He departed the club on 6 July 2023 in order to take up a role in Saudi Arabia.

In July 2025, he became assistant manager of Macclesfield FC.

== Personal life ==
In October 2019, Jeffers admitted sending menacing messages to his wife of 10 years after their relationship broke down.

== Career statistics ==
=== Club ===
Appearances and goals by club, season and competition
Club	Season	League			National Cup (Note: Includes FA Cup, Scottish Cup)		League Cup (Note: Includes Football League Cup, Scottish League Cup)		Continental		Other		Total	
Club	Season	Division	Apps	Goals	Apps	Goals	Apps	Goals	Apps	Goals	Apps	Goals	Apps	Goals
Everton	1997–98	Premier League	1	0	0	0	0	0	—		—		1	0
Everton	1998–99	Premier League	15	6	2	1	0	0	—		—		17	7
Everton	1999–2000	Premier League	21	6	5	0	2	0	—		—		28	6
Everton	2000–01	Premier League	12	6	0	0	2	1	—		—		14	7
Everton	Total		49	18	7	1	4	1	—		—		60	20
Arsenal	2001–02	Premier League	6	2	2	0	0	0	2 (Note: Appearances in UEFA Champions League)	0	—		10	2
Arsenal	2002–03	Premier League	16	2	6	3	1	1	5	0	0	0	28	6
Arsenal	2003–04	Premier League	0	0	—		—		—		1 (Note: Appearance in FA Community Shield)	0	1	0
Arsenal	Total		22	4	8	3	1	1	7	0	1	0	39	8
Everton (loan)	2003–04	Premier League	18	0	3	2	1	0	—		—		22	2
Charlton Athletic	2004–05	Premier League	20	3	2	1	2	1	—		—		24	5
Charlton Athletic	2005–06	Premier League	0	0	0	0	—		—		—		0	0
Charlton Athletic	Total		20	3	2	1	2	1	—		—		24	5
Rangers (loan)	2005–06	Scottish Premier League	8	0	—		2	0	4	0	—		14	0
Blackburn Rovers	2006–07	Premier League	10	0	1	0	1	0	3 (Note: Appearances in UEFA Cup)	1	—		15	1
Ipswich Town (loan)	2006–07	Championship	9	4	—		—		—		—		9	4
Sheffield Wednesday	2007–08	Championship	10	2	1	0	1	0	—		—		12	2
Sheffield Wednesday	2008–09	Championship	31	3	1	0	0	0	—		—		32	3
Sheffield Wednesday	2009–10	Championship	13	0	1	0	2	0	—		—		16	0
Sheffield Wednesday	Total		54	5	3	0	3	0	—		—		60	5
Newcastle Jets	2010–11	A-League	9	1	—		—		—		—		9	1
Motherwell	2010–11	Scottish Premier League	10	1	4	1	—		—		—		14	2
Newcastle Jets	2011–12	A-League	17	1	—		—		—		—		17	1
Floriana	2012–13	Maltese Premier League	2	1	—		—		—		—		2	1
Accrington Stanley	2012–13	League Two	7	2	—		—		—		—		7	2
Career total			235	40	28	8	14	3	14	1	1	0	292	52

=== International ===
Appearances and goals by national team and year
National team	Year	Apps	Goals
England	2003	1	1
Total		1	1

England score listed first, score column indicates score after each Jeffers goal.

List of international goals scored by Francis Jeffers
No.	Date	Venue	Cap	Opponent	Score	Result	Competition	Ref.
1	12 February 2003	Boleyn Ground, London, England	1	Australia	1–2	1–3	Friendly	

== Honours ==
Everton Youth

- FA Youth Cup: 1997–98

Motherwell

- Scottish Cup runner-up: 2010–11
