= Richard Dunne =

Irish footballer (born 1979)

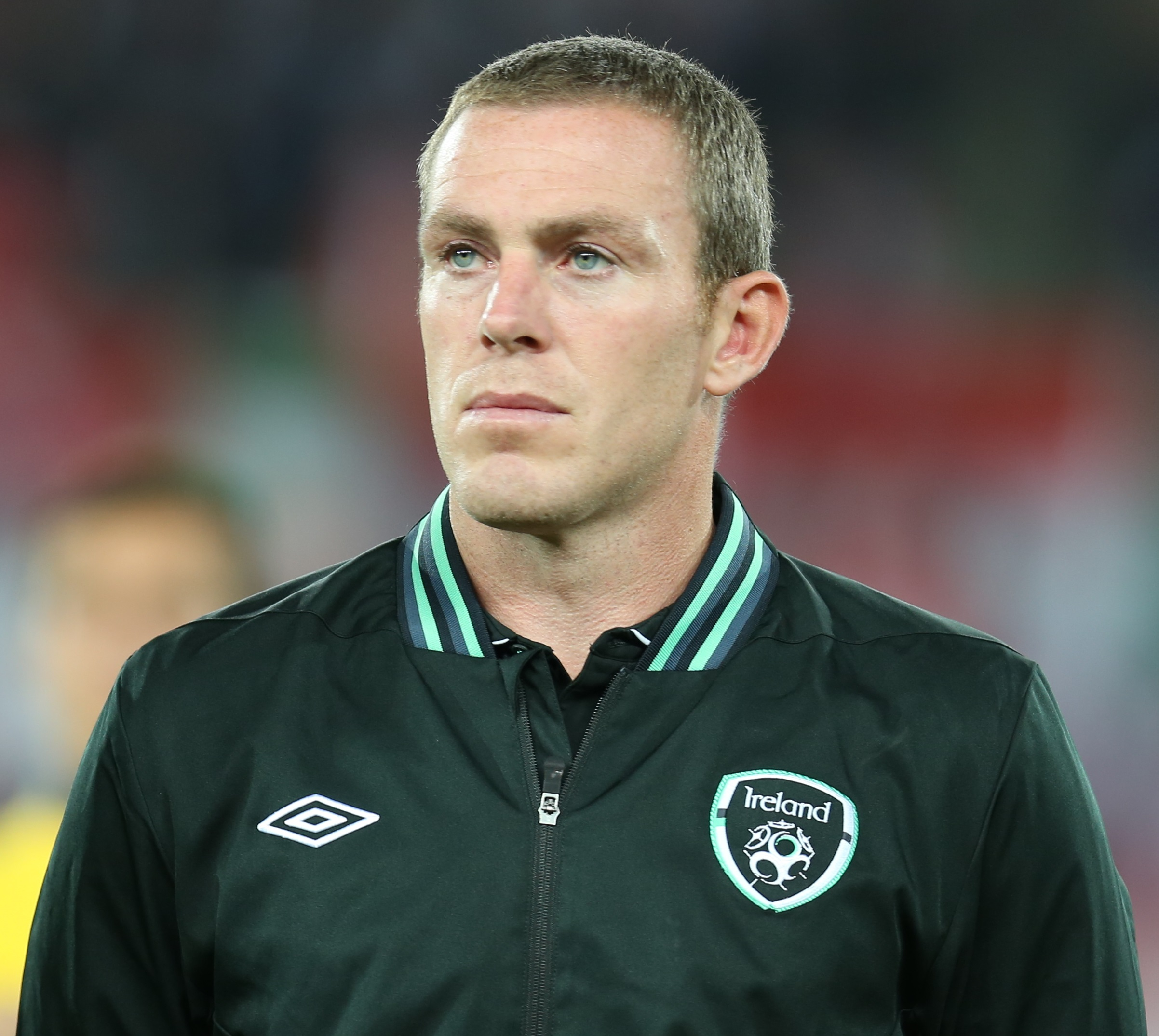
- Dunne with the Republic of Ireland in 2013

Personal information
- Full name: Richard Patrick Dunne
- Date of birth: 21 September 1979 (age 47)
- Place of birth: Tallaght, Dublin, Ireland
- Height: 1.88 m (6 ft 2 in)
- Position: Centre-back

Youth career
- –1996: Home Farm
- 1996–1997: Everton

Senior career*
Years	Team	Apps	(Gls)
1997–2000	Everton	60	(0)
2000–2009	Manchester City	296	(8)
2009–2013	Aston Villa	95	(4)
2013–2015	Queens Park Rangers	64	(1)
Total		515	(13)

International career
1997–1999	Republic of Ireland B	2	(1)
2000–2013	Republic of Ireland	80	(8)
Medal record
Representing Republic of Ireland
Men's association football
UEFA European Under-18 Championship
Gold medal – first place	1998 Cyprus
- * Club domestic league appearances and goals

Richard Patrick Dunne (born 21 September 1979) is an Irish former professional footballer, current Man City Youth Academy Coach and television pundit for TNT Sports, who played as a centre-back. He made 432 Premier League appearances, including 253 for Manchester City. Between 2005–2008 Dunne won four consecutive Man City Player of the year awards.

Dunne began his professional career at Everton. He later spent nearly a decade at Manchester City before joining Aston Villa in 2009. In July 2013, he signed for Queens Park Rangers. He has also played internationally for the Republic of Ireland from 2000 until 2014. With Ireland he was a member of the 2002 FIFA World Cup squad and played in UEFA Euro 2012. Dunne announced his retirement from football in November 2015 after being released by Queens Park Rangers. He is employed as a youth coach in Manchester City's academy.

Dunne holds the joint Premier League record of being sent off – eight times along with Patrick Vieira and Duncan Ferguson. He also holds the Premier League record of scoring ten own goals.

== Club career ==
=== Everton ===
Having played schoolboy football in Dublin for Home Farm, Dunne joined Everton as a 16-year-old schoolboy in 1996. The next season, he started to play for Everton reserves and in early 1997, Dunne signed a 5-year professional contract. He was part of the successful 1998 FA Youth Cup squad along with Tony Hibbert and Leon Osman.

Dunne made his debut under then manager Joe Royle in January 1997, at the age of seventeen. Under Walter Smith, however, he was often used out of position at right back, and was punished by Smith for two separate disciplinary incidents. Wimbledon reportedly had a bid accepted for Dunne, only for it to fall through, and Dunne stayed at Everton for another year, again usually filling in at right back.

=== Manchester City ===
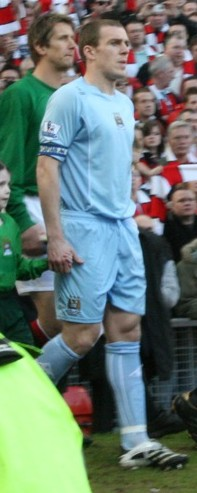
Dunne captaining Manchester City in 2008 against Manchester United in a local derby.

In the autumn of 2000, Dunne was signed by Manchester City for a fee of £3.5 million, rejoining his former manager Joe Royle. City had signed both Dunne and Laurent Charvet as replacements for right back Richard Edghill who had suffered from a dip in form.

It was in the centre of defence where Dunne made his biggest impact on the team. Dunne had various partners in the centre of defence in his first season at the club and for a few games he played in a three-man defence with Andy Morrison and Steve Howey. His first season saw City relegated into the First Division and acquire the services of a new manager, Kevin Keegan. Manchester City made an instant return to the Premier League, finishing the 2001–02 season as First Division champions. Disciplinary problems in 2003 resulted in a club suspension, and his time at Manchester City looked to be over. However, Dunne returned to the first team following an intensive fitness programme, and within a few months gained an international recall.

A number of consistent performances resulted in Dunne receiving Manchester City's Player of the Year award for 2004–05, which he also won in the 2005–06, 2006–07 and 2007–08 seasons, becoming the first player to win City's PotY award four times. In the 2006 close season, at the age of 26, Dunne was appointed club captain, taking over from Sylvain Distin, amidst rumours of Distin leaving City.

On 18 January 2007, Manchester City teammate Micah Richards said: "Ever since I've come to this club Richard has just been quality. I play with him week in, week out and I think he's one of the best players I've played with. I've played with John Terry and Rio Ferdinand in the England squad but Richard is right up there with them."

On 4 July 2008, Dunne signed a new four-year contract with Manchester City to keep him at the club until 2012.

In August 2008, Garry Cook, chief executive of City, said "China and India are gagging for football content to watch and we're going to tell them that City is their content. We need a superstar to get through that door. Richard Dunne doesn't roll off the tongue in Beijing."

Dunne continued to play throughout 2008–09 making 47 starts in all competitions despite three red cards. He marked his 29th Birthday with a goal in the 6–0 win against Portsmouth on 21 September 2008, while his eighth Premier League red card against Wigan Athletic in January 2009 equalled a record set by Patrick Vieira and Duncan Ferguson.

=== Aston Villa ===
Following the signings of Kolo Touré and Joleon Lescott, it was reported that Dunne could leave the City of Manchester Stadium with Aston Villa the most likely destination. Villa confirmed on 27 August 2009, that they had agreed a fee with Manchester City for the defender. Aston Villa filed the paperwork for the deal before the close of the transfer window but the Premier League announced that the deal could not be "ratified" until 2 September 2009, when the deal was completed. Villa manager Martin O'Neill later stated the fee paid for Dunne was £5 million and that the player had signed a four-year deal.

Dunne made his debut in a 1–0 win over Birmingham City at St. Andrew's, courtesy of an 85th-minute strike from Gabriel Agbonlahor. Following the game, Dunne praised his new teammates James Collins, Carlos Cuéllar and Stephen Warnock, claiming that their partnership in defence "seems to have worked reasonably well".

On 5 October 2009, Dunne scored his first goal for Villa, coincidentally against his former club Manchester City, in a 1–1 draw. He was applauded by Manchester City fans for his respect in refusing to celebrate his goal. He netted his second goal later that month in the team's 2–1 home victory over Chelsea. On 28 February 2010, he started for Aston Villa in their 2010 Football League Cup Final defeat to Manchester United at Wembley Stadium. He was named in the PFA Team of the Year for the 2009–10 season.

On 11 December 2010, Dunne was dropped from the team and replaced by Carlos Cuéllar. Dunne was recalled to the starting line up in the away game against Chelsea at Stamford Bridge which Villa ended up drawing 3–3.

On 18 March 2011, Dunne and Collins were fined a total of £200,000 – two weeks' wages each – by Villa for a drunken confrontation with club staff during a team-bonding exercise.

At the end of the 2010–11 season, Dunne made 35 appearances in all competitions for Villa.

Ahead of the 2011–12 season, new manager Alex McLeish said because of his aerial ability and such good awareness on the ball he will be an automatic first choice at the back. On 27 July 2011, he started and played the full 90 minutes in the 1–0 victory over Blackburn Rovers in the 2011 Premier League Asia Trophy held in Hong Kong. On 30 July 2011, he started the final with Chelsea and also completed the full 90 minutes in a 2–0 defeat.

On 12 February 2012, Dunne fractured his right clavicle in a collision with Joe Hart during a Premier League match against his former club Manchester City. He had surgery in Birmingham the following day. Dunne travelled to the NFL team the Cleveland Browns in order to attain specialised medical care for his injury, who at the time were owned by then-chairman of Aston Villa, Randy Lerner.

In May 2013, manager Paul Lambert announced that the Irishman was being released on a free transfer.

=== Queens Park Rangers ===
Dunne (left) marking Eden Hazard whilst playing for Queens Park Rangers.

Dunne joined Queens Park Rangers on 15 July 2013, on a free transfer. He made his first QPR appearance against Exeter City in the League Cup. He scored his first goal for Rangers against Burnley on 1 February 2014. In his first season at QPR he made a total of 45 appearances scoring one goal and was part of the team that won promotion back to the Premier League via the 2014 Football League Championship play-off final against Derby County.

Dunne holds the unfortunate record of the most own goals in the Premier League, scoring his tenth in a 3–2 defeat against Liverpool on 19 October 2014, in a game which saw QPR score two own goals to hand Liverpool the victory.

QPR were eventually relegated that season, finishing in last place with 20 more goals conceded than any other side. Dunne made a total of 24 appearances.

On 31 May 2015, Dunne's contract expired and, along with five other players he was released by the club. There was considerable speculation regarding his plans after QPR and he was linked with moves to MLS, the Indian Super League and the League of Ireland. None of these materialized however, and he formally announced his retirement from football in November 2015. He now lives with his wife and two children in Monte Carlo.

== International career ==
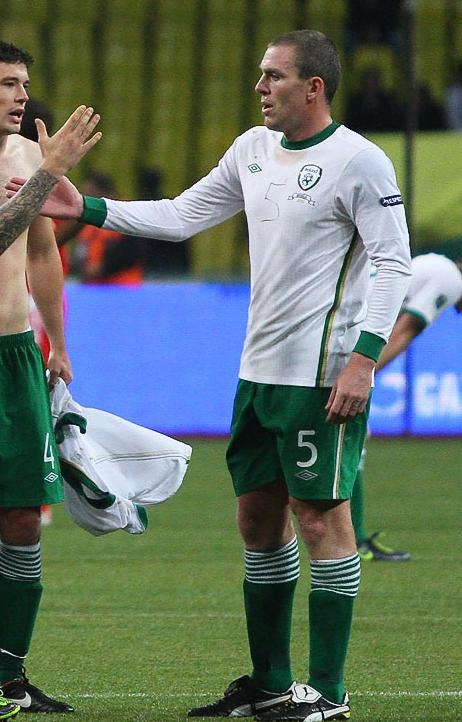
Richard Dunne after a famous performance for Ireland against Russia in Moscow. Dunne's contributions helped seal eventual qualification for UEFA Euro 2012.

Dunne played for the Republic of Ireland national under-19 football team in the 1997 UEFA European Under-18 Football Championship finals in Iceland. Dunne made his debut for the Republic of Ireland on 26 April 2000 in a 1–0 loss against Greece in a friendly match. His first international goal came just two months later in only his third cap as he scored on 4 June against Mexico, helping his team come from 2–0 down to drawing 2–2. He was selected by Mick McCarthy to play against the likes of the Netherlands and Portugal during Ireland's successful 2002 FIFA World Cup qualification campaign, where he also scored his first competitive international goal in a 2–0 win against Estonia.

Dunne was part of the Irish squad that played at the 2002 FIFA World Cup, but the centre-half pairing of Gary Breen and Steve Staunton (the latter of whom became team captain following the departure of Roy Keane) was favoured by Mick McCarthy, meaning Dunne did not even make an appearance as a substitute. The emergence of John O'Shea, and Brian Kerr's preference for Kenny Cunningham, meant that Dunne's chances with Ireland were extremely limited during their unsuccessful attempt to qualify for UEFA Euro 2004. He did score his fourth international goal in a friendly against Turkey just prior to the end of the campaign. Dunne again found himself out of favour with Kerr during the qualification campaign for the 2006 FIFA World Cup, only featuring in the final three matches which included a 1–0 defeat to France, a game that ultimately cost Ireland qualification. Another change of manager for Ireland saw Dunne's former teammate, Steve Staunton, use him during the majority of the Euro 2008 qualifying campaign. Early defeats to Germany and a humiliating 5–2 loss to Cyprus, a match in which Dunne scored before giving away a penalty and being sent off, ensured qualification was always beyond the Irish. Dunne only missed three of the twelve matches, due to suspension and injury rather than form.

Giovanni Trapattoni was appointed Ireland manager for the qualification campaign ahead of the 2010 FIFA World Cup and cemented Dunne as Ireland's first choice central defender. Dunne played in all ten games helping Ireland finish second and qualify for a play-off whilst also scoring goals in both 1–1 draws with Bulgaria, as well as winning the man of the match award in the away game held in Sofia. He also played the entire matches in both legs against France, as Ireland were controversially knocked out 2–1 on aggregate after extra-time. Dunne was famously pictured sitting distraught on the pitch in Paris as Thierry Henry, who assisted William Gallas' winning goal after controlling the ball with his hand, consoled Dunne.

On 8 February 2011, Dunne started and completed the full 90 minutes in Ireland's first Nations Cup game against Wales in a 3–0 win. On 26 March 2011, he started and played the full 90 minutes in the Group B Euro 2012 qualifying against Macedonia in a 2–1 victory at the Aviva Stadium. On 10 August 2011, he started and played the full 90 minutes alongside Sean St. Ledger in the goalless draw against Croatia at the Aviva Stadium.

On 6 September 2011, Dunne started and played the full 90 minutes in the goalless draw against Russia in Moscow. Dunne gave perhaps the best performance of his career, winning the man of the match award as he almost single-handedly stopped a Russian team which totally dominated midfield and created wave after wave of attacks. Former Ireland defender Paul McGrath described Dunne's heroics as the best performance from an Irish central defender he had ever witnessed, including his own performance against Italy in the 1994 FIFA World Cup.

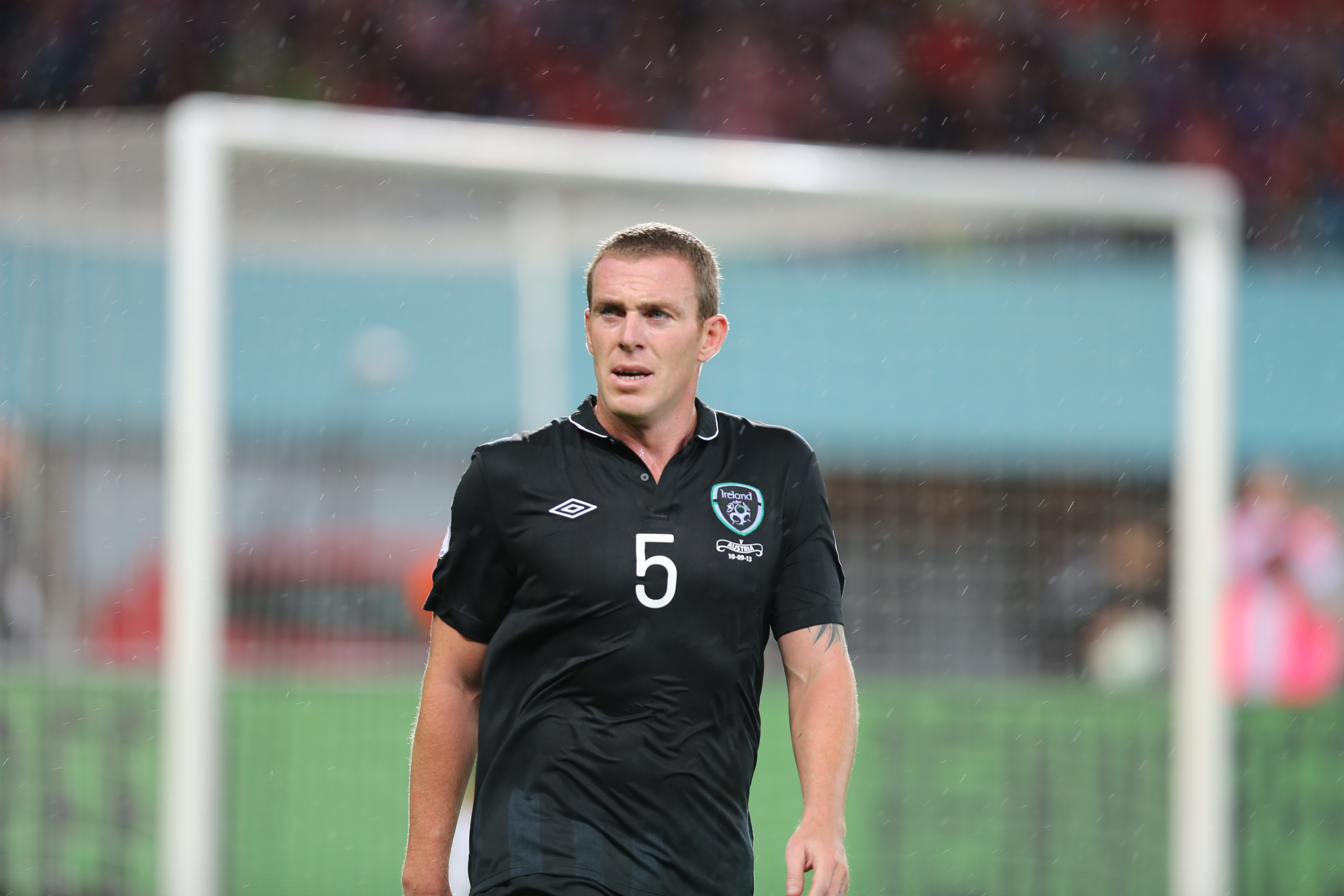
Dunne in action for Ireland in September 2013.

On 11 October 2011, Dunne started and played the full 90 minutes in a 2–1 victory for Ireland over Armenia at the Aviva Stadium which gained them a play-off spot for UEFA Euro 2012, scoring in the 60th minute his eighth goal on his 69th international appearance for his country. After the team qualified for UEFA Euro 2012 with an unprecedented 5–1 aggregate play-off win over their opponents Estonia, Dunne described it as "the best experience I've probably had in football". He started in all three of Ireland's Group C matches at UEFA Euro 2012, as they were defeated 3–1 by Croatia, 4–0 by Spain, and 2–0 by Italy.

On 2 June 2013, Dunne made his return to the national team for the first time in a year as a second half substitution against Georgia in a 4–0 Irish win. Dunne made his return to the Irish team in his first competitive game for 15 months in a 1–2 loss to Sweden at the Aviva Stadium in 2014 FIFA World Cup qualifying.

On 31 July 2014, Dunne retired from international football.

== Media career ==
After retiring in 2015 he joined BT Sport as a pundit for their coverage of the Premier League, FA Cup, UEFA Champions League and UEFA Europa League. Dunne has been praised for his insightful and opinionated style of punditry.

== Personal life ==
His son Tayo Dunne is also a professional footballer, having made his first-team debut for Barnsley in August 2026. Dunne is related to footballers Theo Dunne (uncle) and Gavin Molloy (second cousin).

== Career statistics ==
=== Club ===
Appearances and goals by club, season and competition
Club	Season	League			FA Cup		League Cup		Europe		Other		Total	
Club	Season	Division	Apps	Goals	Apps	Goals	Apps	Goals	Apps	Goals	Apps	Goals	Apps	Goals
Everton	1996–97	Premier League	7	0	1	0	0	0	—		—		8	0
Everton	1997–98	Premier League	3	0	1	0	0	0	—		—		4	0
Everton	1998–99	Premier League	16	0	2	0	2	0	—		—		20	0
Everton	1999–2000	Premier League	31	0	4	0	1	0	—		—		36	0
Everton	2000–01	Premier League	3	0	0	0	1	0	—		—		4	0
Everton	Total		60	0	8	0	4	0	—		—		72	0
Manchester City	2000–01	Premier League	25	0	3	0	0	0	—		—		28	0
Manchester City	2001–02	First Division	43	1	3	0	3	0	—		—		49	1
Manchester City	2002–03	Premier League	25	0	0	0	1	0	—		—		26	0
Manchester City	2003–04	Premier League	29	0	5	0	2	0	4 (Note: Appearances in UEFA Cup)	0	—		40	0
Manchester City	2004–05	Premier League	35	2	1	0	0	0	—		—		36	2
Manchester City	2005–06	Premier League	32	3	5	0	1	0	—		—		38	3
Manchester City	2006–07	Premier League	38	1	5	0	1	0	—		—		44	1
Manchester City	2007–08	Premier League	36	0	3	0	3	0	—		—		42	0
Manchester City	2008–09	Premier League	31	1	1	0	1	0	14	0	—		47	1
Manchester City	2009–10	Premier League	2	0	0	0	0	0	—		—		2	0
Manchester City	Total		296	8	26	0	12	0	18	0	—		352	8
Aston Villa	2009–10	Premier League	35	3	4	0	5	0	0	0	—		44	3
Aston Villa	2010–11	Premier League	32	0	2	0	1	0	0	0	—		35	0
Aston Villa	2011–12	Premier League	28	1	2	1	2	0	—		—		32	2
Aston Villa	2012–13	Premier League	0	0	0	0	0	0	—		—		0	0
Aston Villa	Total		95	4	8	1	8	0	0	0	—		111	5
Queens Park Rangers	2013–14	Championship	41	1	0	0	1	0	—		3 (Note: Appearances in Football League play-offs)	0	45	1
Queens Park Rangers	2014–15	Premier League	23	0	0	0	1	0	—		—		24	0
Queens Park Rangers	Total		64	1	0	0	2	0	—		3	0	69	1
Career total			515	13	42	1	26	0	18	0	3	0	604	14

=== International ===
Scores and results list Republic of Ireland's goal tally first, score column indicates score after each Dunne goal.

List of international goals scored by Richard Dunne
No.	Date	Venue	Opponent	Score	Result	Competition
1	4 June 2000	Soldier Field, Chicago, United States	Mexico		2–2	2000 U.S. Cup
2	11 October 2000	Lansdowne Road, Dublin	Estonia		2–0	2002 FIFA World Cup qualification
3	6 June 2001	Lilleküla Stadium, Tallinn, Estonia	Estonia		2–0	2002 FIFA World Cup qualification
4	9 September 2003	Lansdowne Road, Dublin	Turkey		2–2	Friendly
5	7 October 2006	Neo GSP Stadium, Nicosia, Cyprus	Cyprus		2–5	UEFA Euro 2008 qualifying
6	28 March 2009	Croke Park, Dublin	Bulgaria		1–1	2010 FIFA World Cup qualification
7	6 June 2009	Vasil Levski National Stadium, Sofia, Bulgaria	Bulgaria		1–1	2010 FIFA World Cup qualification
8	11 October 2011	Aviva Stadium, Dublin	Armenia		2–1	UEFA Euro 2012 qualifying

== Honours ==
Manchester City

- Football League First Division: 2001–02

Aston Villa

- Football League Cup runner-up: 2009–10

Queens Park Rangers

- Football League Championship play-offs: 2014

Republic of Ireland

- Nations Cup: 2011
