= Kevin Campbell (footballer) =

English footballer (1970–2024)

- Campbell with Everton

Personal information
- Full name: Kevin Joseph Campbell
- Date of birth: 4 February 1970
- Place of birth: Lambeth, London, England
- Date of death: 15 June 2024 (aged 54)
- Place of death: Manchester, England
- Height: 6 ft 0 in (1.83 m)
- Position: Striker

Youth career
- 1985–1988: Arsenal

Senior career*
Years	Team	Apps	(Gls)
1988–1995	Arsenal	163	(46)
1989	→ Leyton Orient (loan)	16	(9)
1989–1990	→ Leicester City (loan)	11	(5)
1995–1998	Nottingham Forest	77	(32)
1998–1999	Trabzonspor	18	(5)
1999	→ Everton (loan)	8	(9)
1999–2005	Everton	137	(36)
2005–2006	West Bromwich Albion	45	(6)
2006–2007	Cardiff City	19	(0)
Total		494	(147)

International career
1990–1992	England U21	4	(1)
1991	England B	1	(0)
- * Club domestic league appearances and goals

Kevin Joseph Campbell (4 February 1970 – 15 June 2024) was an English professional footballer, sports television pundit and commentator.

A striker, Campbell played in the Premier League for Arsenal, Nottingham Forest, Everton and West Bromwich Albion. He also played in the Turkish Süper Lig for Trabzonspor, and in the Football League for Arsenal, Leyton Orient, Leicester City and Cardiff City.

Campbell was capped four times by England U21, scoring once, and received a call-up to the England B team in 1991, for whom he earned one cap.

== Early life ==
Campbell was born in south London, the sixth of seven children in a family of Jamaican origin. He was raised by his single mother.

== Club career ==
=== Arsenal ===
Campbell began his career as a trainee with Arsenal, joining the club on schoolboy forms in 1985. He was prolific for Arsenal's Academy, scoring 59 goals in one season. Campbell also won the FA Youth Cup of 1988 with Arsenal. He went on to make his first-team debut against Everton on 7 May 1988, although the club's forward positions at the time were usually taken by Paul Merson and Alan Smith.

Campbell came to prominence during a loan spell at Leyton Orient in 1989 when he scored nine goals in 16 games. Campbell helped see the club to promotion during that season but did not play in their victorious playoff final against Wrexham as his loan spell had just ended. Orient manager Frank Clark wanted to make the move permanent but Arsenal refused to sell. At the start of the 1989–90 season, he was again loaned out, this time to Leicester City. The following season, he established himself in the Arsenal team, scoring eight times in ten matches during the run-in to the club's First Division title win.

Despite Arsenal signing Ian Wright in September 1991, Campbell continued to feature in the team. He scored for Arsenal against Millwall and Derby County in Arsenal's victorious 1992–93 campaigns in the FA Cup and League Cup. In the 1993–94 season, he scored 19 goals, his best for the Gunners. He also featured in the victorious 1993–94 European Cup Winners' Cup campaign, scoring four goals, including one in the semi-final against Paris Saint-Germain. His form for the club waned in 1994–95, and the arrivals of forwards John Hartson and Chris Kiwomya saw his playing time reduced. Campbell played 224 times for Arsenal, scoring 60 goals.

=== Nottingham Forest ===
In the summer of 1995, Campbell was sold to Nottingham Forest, for an initial fee of £2.5 million, where he spent three seasons. He was part of the team that was relegated in 1997, but his 23 goals the following season helped see the Reds win the Division One title in 1998.

=== Trabzonspor ===
Campbell controversially left Forest at the end of the 1997–98 season, against the will of their manager, Dave Bassett, to join Turkish side Trabzonspor for £2.5 million, a move which caused Forest teammate Pierre van Hooijdonk to go "on strike". His time in Trabzon saw him leave the club after seven months after a racist incident which involved club president Mehmet Ali Yılmaz calling him a "cannibal". Campbell and his teammates also had not been paid, something which he demanded they rectify. To show solidarity with Campbell, the two club captains, Ogün Temizkanoğlu and Abdullah Ercan, were at his side during a press conference in which he stated his reasons for leaving the club.

=== Everton ===
Everton, who were battling against relegation from the Premier League, signed Campbell on loan in March 1999. His impact on the side was immediate as he scored nine goals in his first eight games. These feats made him Everton's top goalscorer both at home and away from Goodison Park for that season. His six goals, which were scored in his first three games, earned him Everton's player of the month award for April, making him the first loanee to be bestowed with the title.

Campbell's move to Everton was made permanent in the summer of 1999 for a fee of £3 million. In the 1999–2000 season, he scored Everton's winning goal in the Merseyside derby against Liverpool at Anfield, which was Everton's last win at Anfield before 2021, when Everton defeated Liverpool 2–0. He ended the season as the club's top scorer, with 12 goals scored altogether.

Campbell was Everton's leading goalscorer in 2000–01, but scored just four times during the 2001–02 campaign and returned to the top in 2002–03. After that, injuries limited his appearances for the club and he left in 2005.

Campbell is Everton's fifth-highest Premier League goalscorer, behind Romelu Lukaku, Duncan Ferguson, Tim Cahill and Dominic Calvert-Lewin. He was also Everton's first black captain.

=== West Bromwich Albion ===
Campbell moved to West Bromwich Albion in January 2005 on a free transfer and helped the club retain its Premiership status. This endeavour marked the first time that a club that had been at the bottom of the top division on Christmas Day had gone on to avoid relegation.

=== Cardiff City ===
In May 2006, after West Brom were relegated to the Championship, Campbell was released by the club. He signed for Cardiff City on a free transfer on 2 August 2006. He scored in an FAW Premier Cup quarter-final match away at Carmarthen Town for Cardiff, on 13 February 2007. He was then released by the club in May 2007, thus bringing to an end his career.

== International career ==
Campbell earned four caps for the England U-21s and one for England B. He holds the record of being the English player who has scored the most goals in the Premier League without earning a senior cap for his country. In September 1992 he was on stand-by for a friendly against Spain, but this was the nearest he got to being in the senior squad.

== Media career ==
Campbell was featured on the Sky Sports series Where are They Now? in 2008, when he was the co-owner of security company T1 Protection, specialising in supplying bodyguards to celebrities and other wealthy customers whilst travelling abroad. He also worked with Asia-based Sony TEN as a commentator for their Premier League and Champions League coverage.

Campbell ran a record label, 2 Wikid, first signing rapper Mark Morrison, who had previously topped the charts with "Return of the Mack" in 1996. In December 2004, he obtained a court injunction against rival label Jet Star to prevent it from releasing Morrison's album, Innocent Man. The injunction was lifted shortly afterward. The first single released by 2 Wikid was that of Panjabi MC's tune "Backstabbers", a remix of Morrison's original song, which had been released in 2004.

== Personal life and death ==
Campbell's elder son Tyrese is also a professional footballer. His younger son played in non-league football.

Campbell became ill in early 2024 and was admitted to hospital a number of times. He was admitted to Manchester Royal Infirmary (MRI) in May and died there on 15 June. An interim coroner's report attributed Campbell's death to infective endocarditis leading to multiple organ failure. The hospital conducted an internal investigation over concerns about Campbell's treatment at MRI. In April 2025, the coroner recorded a death by natural causes, and concluded that the late diagnosis of infective endocarditis "did not more than minimally contribute" to his death.

On Campbell's death, Everton called him "not just a true Goodison Park hero and icon of the English game, but an incredible person as well".

== Career statistics ==
Appearances and goals by club, season and competition
Club	Season	League			FA Cup		League Cup		Europe		Other		Total	
Club	Season	Division	Apps	Goals	Apps	Goals	Apps	Goals	Apps	Goals	Apps	Goals	Apps	Goals
Arsenal	1987–88	First Division	1	0	0	0	0	0	–		–		1	0
Arsenal	1988–89	First Division	0	0	0	0	0	0	–		–		0	0
Arsenal	1989–90	First Division	14	2	0	0	0	0	–		–		14	2
Arsenal	1990–91	First Division	20	9	4	1	1	0	–		–		25	10
Arsenal	1991–92	First Division	31	13	1	0	2	0	4 (Note: Appearances in European Cup)	1	1 (Note: Appearance in FA Charity Shield)	0	39	14
Arsenal	1992–93	Premier League	37	4	6	1	5	4	–		–		48	9
Arsenal	1993–94	Premier League	37	14	3	0	2	1	8 (Note: Appearances in UEFA Cup Winners' Cup)	4	1	0	51	19
Arsenal	1994–95	Premier League	23	4	2	0	5	1	3	0	2 (Note: Appearances in UEFA Super Cup)	0	35	5
Arsenal	Total		163	46	16	2	15	6	15	5	4	0	213	59
Leyton Orient (loan)	1988–89	Fourth Division	16	9	–		–		–		–		16	9
Leicester City (loan)	1989–90	Second Division	11	5	–		–		–		1 (Note: Appearances in Full Members' Cup)	1	12	6
Nottingham Forest	1995–96	Premier League	21	3	5	3	0	0	3 (Note: Appearances in UEFA Cup)	0	–		29	6
Nottingham Forest	1996–97	Premier League	17	6	1	0	0	0	–		–		18	6
Nottingham Forest	1997–98	First Division	39	22	0	0	0	0	–		–		39	22
Nottingham Forest	Total		77	31	2	0	0	0	3	0	–		82	31
Trabzonspor	1998–99	1.Lig	18	5	0	0	–		–		–		18	5
Everton (loan)	1998–99	Premier League	8	9	–		–		–		–		8	9
Everton	1999–2000	Premier League	26	12	3	0	2	0	–		–		31	12
Everton	2000–01	Premier League	29	9	1	0	0	0	–		–		30	9
Everton	2001–02	Premier League	23	4	2	1	1	0	–		–		26	5
Everton	2002–03	Premier League	36	10	0	0	3	2	–		–		39	12
Everton	2003–04	Premier League	17	1	1	0	0	0	–		–		18	1
Everton	2004–05	Premier League	6	0	–		1	0	–		–		7	0
Everton	Total		145	45	7	1	7	2	–		–		159	48
West Bromwich Albion	2004–05	Premier League	16	3	2	0	–		–		–		18	3
West Bromwich Albion	2005–06	Premier League	29	3	1	0	1	0	–		–		31	3
West Bromwich Albion	Total		45	6	3	0	1	0	–		–		49	6
Cardiff City	2006–07	Championship	19	0	0	0	1	0	–		–		20	0
Career total			494	147	28	3	24	8	18	5	5	1	569	164

== Honours ==
Arsenal Youth

- FA Youth Cup: 1987–88

Arsenal

- Football League First Division: 1990–91
- FA Cup: 1992–93
- Football League Cup: 1992–93
- FA Charity Shield: 1991 (shared)
- European Cup Winners' Cup: 1993–94

Nottingham Forest

- Football League First Division: 1997–98

Individual

- Premier League Player of the Month: April 1999
