= Peter Clarke (footballer) =

English footballer (born 1982)

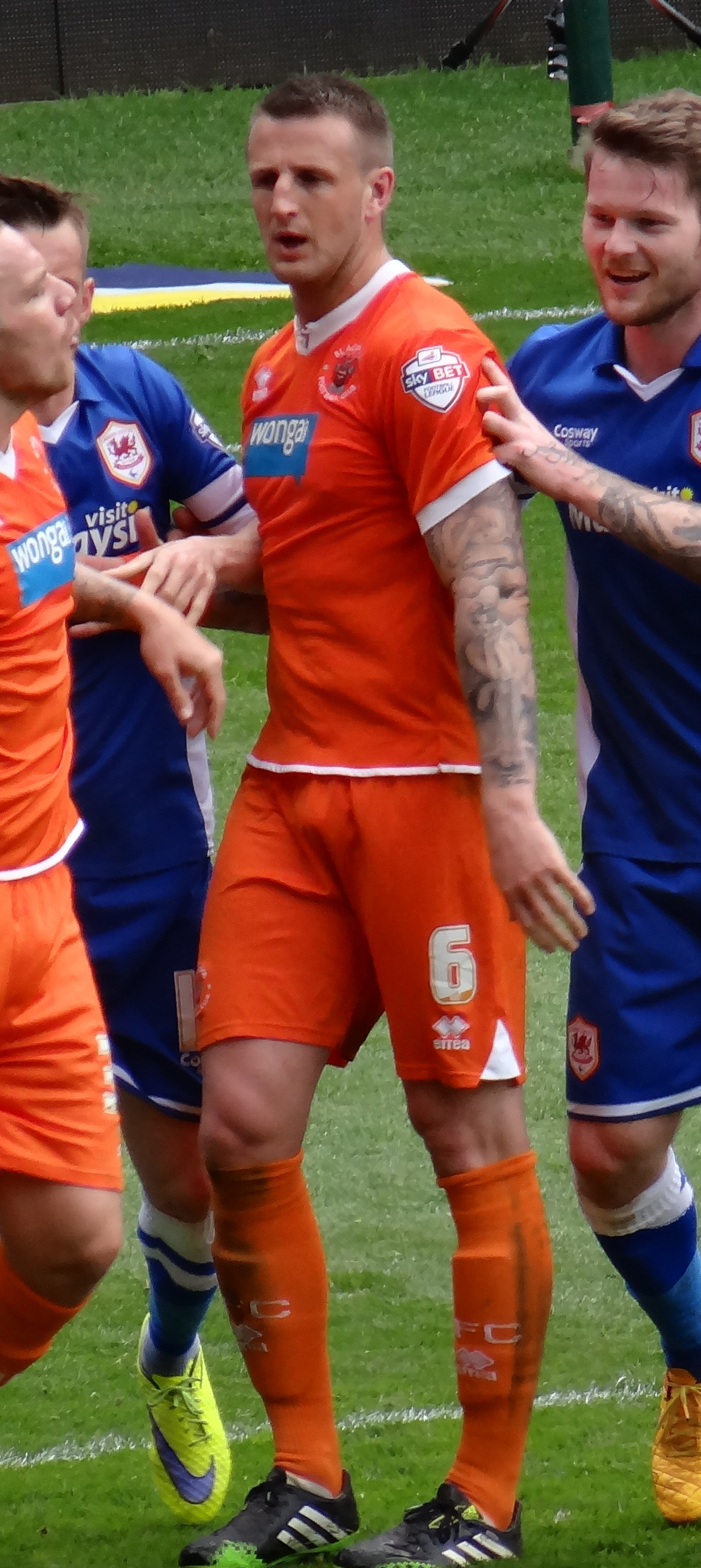
- Clarke playing for Blackpool in 2015

Personal information
- Full name: Peter Michael Clarke
- Date of birth: 3 January 1982 (age 44)
- Place of birth: Southport, England
- Height: 6 ft 0 in (1.83 m)
- Position: Defender

Team information
- Current team: Prescot Cables

Youth career
- Everton

Senior career*
Years	Team	Apps	(Gls)
1999–2004	Everton	9	(0)
2002	→ Blackpool (loan)	16	(3)
2003	→ Port Vale (loan)	13	(1)
2004	→ Coventry City (loan)	5	(0)
2004–2006	Blackpool	84	(11)
2006–2009	Southend United	126	(10)
2009–2014	Huddersfield Town	192	(9)
2014–2015	Blackpool	39	(2)
2015–2016	Bury	45	(1)
2016–2019	Oldham Athletic	107	(10)
2018	→ Bury (loan)	18	(1)
2019–2020	Fleetwood Town	12	(1)
2020–2022	Tranmere Rovers	98	(7)
2022–2023	Walsall	14	(0)
2022–2023	→ Oldham Athletic (loan)	16	(2)
2023–2025	Warrington Town	73	(2)
2025–	Prescot Cables	29	(0)

International career
1997	England U16	1	(0)
1997–1998	England Schoolboys	8	(1)
1997–1999	England U17	11	(0)
2000	England U18	1	(0)
2000–2001	England U19	10	(2)
2001–2002	England U20	9	(0)
2002–2003	England U21	8	(0)
- * Club domestic league appearances and goals as of 08:05, 24 August 2026 (UTC)

Peter Michael Clarke (born 3 January 1982) is an English professional footballer who plays as a centre back for Northern Premier League Division One West club Prescot Cables. He has made in excess of 1,000 career appearances.

Clarke began his career with Everton. During his time there, he made nine league appearances and had loan spells with Blackpool, Port Vale and Coventry City. He then joined Blackpool permanently in 2004, where he also captained the club. He also captained Southend United, who he joined in 2006 before joining Huddersfield Town in 2009. He helped the "Terriers" to win promotion out of League One via the play-offs in 2012. He returned to Blackpool in July 2014 but was released after the club were relegated at the end of the season. He joined Bury in May 2015 and then moved on to Oldham Athletic in July 2016. He rejoined former club Bury on loan in January 2018 and signed with Fleetwood Town in August 2019 following his release from Oldham. He moved on to Tranmere Rovers in January 2020 and played for the club in 2021 EFL Trophy final. He joined Walsall in June 2022 and was loaned to Oldham Athletic five months later. He signed with non-League club Warrington Town in July 2023 and moved on to Prescot Cables after two seasons.

He won the Player of the Season award at Blackpool, Southend, Huddersfield (twice), Bury and Oldham Athletic (twice) in the 2004–05, 2008–09, 2009–10, 2010–11, 2015–16, 2016–17 and 2018–19 seasons respectively. Clarke also gained eight caps for the England under-21 team between 2002 and 2003. At the age of 40, he was named in both the EFL League Two Team of the Season and PFA Team of the Year for the 2021–22 campaign.

== Club career ==
=== Everton ===
Clarke started his career with Everton, signing his first professional contract in January 1999. He made his senior debut in 2001 against Coventry City. He made just nine appearances in the Premier League, largely in the unfamiliar position of right-back, rather than his preferred centre-half position. In August 2002, he went on out loan to Blackpool, where he made 16 league appearances, scoring three goals (two of which came on his home debut) in a three-month loan spell. His performances played a large part in the "Seasiders" stringing together a run of clean sheets and rising to the edge of the 2002–03 play-off picture. Despite manager Steve McMahon's best efforts, a permanent deal did not materialise, and Clarke returned to Goodison Park in early November. In February 2003, he went out on loan again, this time to Port Vale, also of the Second Division, where he made 13 appearances in another three months. He won praise from manager Brian Horton for his strong work ethic. He spent February 2004 on loan at First Division Coventry City, playing five games. His contract with Everton expired at the end of the 2003–04 season, and he turned down the club's offer of a new contract, though he remained at the club on a month-to-month contract.

=== Blackpool ===
In September 2004, Clarke signed for Blackpool, then managed by Colin Hendry, initially on a one-month loan but with an agreement to make the move permanent, for £150,000. When Clarke joined, Blackpool were bottom of the league and in danger of relegation, but they climbed to 16th position (and safety) by the season's conclusion. His contribution was recognized at the end of season award evening, as he picked up the Player of the Year award, as well as three other individual awards. Despite the departure of Hendry, he continued to be a key part of the club's line-up, playing all 46 league games in the 2005–06 season under new manager Simon Grayson. At the end of that campaign, he picked up the Blackpool Gazette and Supporters Websites awards, as well as the Alan Lowis Memorial Trophy. He made a total of 93 appearances for Blackpool during his second spell with the club and was also the club's captain.

=== Southend United ===
In August 2006 Clarke left Blackpool, despite the offer of an improved contract, and signed for Championship newcomers Southend United. He signed a three-year contract for an undisclosed fee, citing his desire to play Championship football. Clarke hoped the club could progress and even reach the top-flight; however, Southend were relegated back into League One at the end of his first season after finishing seven points short of safety. He spent the 2007–08 season back in League One, and promotion hopes were ended following a 5–1 defeat to Doncaster Rovers in the play-off semi-finals. In June 2008 Clarke was transfer-listed, along with Nicky Bailey and Simon Francis, after the three failed to agree terms over contract extensions. Chairman Ron Martin blamed Clarke's agent for unsettling him at the club.

A move did not materialise, and Clarke continued to play for Southend in the 2008–09 season and vowed to give his best until his situation was resolved. On 3 January 2009, Clarke scored a last-minute headed equaliser against Chelsea, a team challenging for the Premier League title, in an FA Cup third round tie. BBC journalist Phil McNulty called it a "career-defining moment" for Clarke in a piece about the "magic" of the FA Cup. Clarke built up a strong defensive partnership with young Frenchman Dorian Dervite. However, chairman Ron Martin told the press that Clarke had snubbed talks of extending his contract beyond the summer. despite the club's wish to keep hold of the player. Clarke denied this and stated that "I'm just waiting for him [Martin] to come and speak to me". Following the club's eighth-place finish, Clarke was voted the club's Player of the Season for the 2008–09 season by both fans and players.

=== Huddersfield Town ===
In June 2009, Clarke announced that he had agreed a three-year contract with League One side Huddersfield Town. He stated that he believed he was taking career to a higher level by securing the switch from Southend to Huddersfield. In doing so he rejected an offer from Charlton Athletic. The following month manager Lee Clark appointed Clarke as club captain. He made his debut in a 2–2 draw against Southend United at Roots Hall on 8 August. He scored his first goal for the "Terriers" ten days later in a 7–1 win over Brighton & Hove Albion at the Galpharm Stadium. On 14 November, Clarke added two more goals in a 6–0 win over Wycombe Wanderers. He also scored the goal in Huddersfield's 1–0 home win over Millwall. He was named Player of the Season for Huddersfield. He captained Huddersfield to a sixth-placed finish in League One, securing a play-off semi-final spot after playing in all 46 league games. They lost out 2–0 to Millwall at the semi-final stage.

In 2010–11, Clarke led his side to a third-place finish, again an ever-present in the first XI, starting and finishing all league games. He was rewarded with a new three-year contract, keeping him at the club until summer 2014. This time they made it into the play-off final, where they were beaten 3–0 by Peterborough United. Clarke was made Town's Player of the Year for the second consecutive season, and was also made PFA Fans' Player of the Year for League One. During the 2011–12 season, Clarke was limited to 31 league appearances for the Terriers due to an injury picked up in September 2011 and the form of the club's other centre-backs, missing much of the club's games in September and February. Clarke would lead Huddersfield to fourth place during the regular season to qualify for the play-offs for a third consecutive year. This time, Town went through to the final after winning 3–2 on aggregate against MK Dons, to beat Sheffield United 8–7 on penalties; Clarke scored the first of eight consecutive penalty successes after three misses from his teammates. He made 47 appearances in the 2012–13 campaign, helping Huddersfield to remain four points above the relegation zone by the end of the season. He played 28 games in the 2013–14 season, as manager Mark Robins led the club to a 17th-place finish. He missed 12 weeks of the campaign after suffering medial knee ligament damage. Having made 225 appearances for the club in five years, he left the club after not being offered a new contract in the summer.

=== Return to Blackpool ===
In July 2014, Clarke rejoined Blackpool – now in the Championship and managed by José Riga – on a one-year deal. Three months later his former Huddersfield boss Lee Clark was appointed as manager. He was named on the Football League team of the week after leading the Blackpool defence to a clean sheet at home to Wolverhampton Wanderers on 13 September. On 10 January, he scored his first goal in four years to secure a 1–0 win over Millwall at Bloomfield Road; he also made a goal-line clearance during the game and was rewarded with a place on the Football League team of the week. However, the 2014–15 season proved to be an unmitigated disaster for the club, and Blackpool were relegated with six games left to play. In May 2015, he was told by manager Lee Clark that he would be offered a new contract; however, after Clark was sacked later in the month, Clarke was "the surprise name" on Blackpool's released list.

=== Bury ===
On 30 May 2015, it was announced that Clarke had agreed on a two-year contract to join Bury. Having just led the "Shakers" into League One out of League Two with a young defence, manager David Flitcroft stated that Clarke was "a very important signing" due to "his experience, knowledge and understanding of playing at higher levels". Clarke was named on the Football League team of the week for his performance during a 1–0 win over league leaders Walsall on 5 September. He went on to win the club's Player of the Season award for the 2015–16 campaign.

=== Oldham Athletic ===
In July 2016, Clarke signed a one-year contract with League One side Oldham Athletic. He was named as club captain by manager Steve Robinson. He scored his first goal for the "Latics" in a 1–1 draw with Bradford City at Valley Parade on 27 August. He remained a mainstay of a solid defence, however, Oldham's poor offence left the club struggling against relegation. New manager John Sheridan took charge in January 2017 and admitted that he could lose Clarke to a £50,000 bid from Scunthorpe United. However, Clarke remained at Boundary Park, and signed a new two-and-a-half-year contract in March. He was named on the EFL team of the week after scoring the only goal of the game at Chesterfield on 4 February. In total he scored six goals from 53 appearances as Oldham successfully avoided relegation with a 17th-place finish in 2016–17, and he was named as the club's Player's Player of the Season. On 3 January 2018, he rejoined former club Bury on loan for the remainder of the 2017–18 season; manager Chris Lucketti said that "I know all about him, he's a real man, he's a leader". He made 18 appearances for Bury but could not prevent the club from suffering relegation out of League One at the end of the 2017–18 season.

On 8 December 2018, he scored a long-range strike against Crewe Alexandra that was later voted Oldham's goal of the season. On 26 January, he endured a "rollercoaster FA Cup tie" after making a goal-line clearance, scoring an own goal, scoring in the correct goal, giving away a penalty and then getting sent off in a 2–1 defeat at Doncaster Rovers. He was defended by caretaker manager Pete Wild, who said that "as clear as day, it's not a pen" and "their keeper has got Peter Clarke sent off by rolling around with his antics, which, at this level, is poor". He ended the 2018–19 campaign with six goals in 49 appearances, before being released by the club on 8 May, just two days after being named as the club's Player of the Season for the second time.

=== Fleetwood Town ===
On 1 August 2019, Clarke signed a one-year deal with League One side Fleetwood Town after impressing manager Joey Barton with his attitude. He scored three goals in 17 appearances for the Fishermen, though did go over two months without a league start as Harry Souttar and Ashley Eastham had established themselves in a defensive back four.

=== Tranmere Rovers ===
On 1 January 2020, Clarke signed for Tranmere Rovers on an undisclosed-length contract, with manager Micky Mellon looking to add experience to the Rovers defence. Clarke said that "a realistic aim is to maintain our league status and finish in the middle of the table". However, Tranmere were relegated on a points-per-game basis after the 2019–20 season was ended early due to the COVID-19 pandemic in England. Clarke remained at the club as he activated a one-year option in his contract. Rovers reached the final of the EFL Trophy at Wembley Stadium, where they were beaten 1–0 by Sunderland. He was an ever-present in the 2020–21 league campaign as Tranmere qualified for the League Two play-offs. He praised Keith Hill, who succeeded Mike Jackson as manager in October. However, Hill was sacked just says before the play-offs were due to start, with Ian Dawes stepping in as caretaker. Clarke scored a headed goal in the play-offs, though Rovers would be beaten 3–2 on aggregate by Morecambe in the semi-finals.

Clarke was named in the League Two Team of the Season at the EFL Awards and in the PFA Team of the Year after making 51 appearances in the 2021–22 campaign. He missed just two EFL Trophy games in the season despite being one of only five active players over the age of 40 in England's professional leagues. Mellon credited this longevity to Clarke's openness to new ideas, his diet and his dedication to recovery.

=== Walsall ===
On 1 June 2022, Clarke signed a one-year contract with League Two side Walsall after turning down a new deal with Tranmere; he previously played with "Saddlers" boss Michael Flynn at Blackpool. He played 16 games for the club. On 11 November 2022, he rejoined Oldham Athletic – now in the National League – on loan until 1 January. On 29 December, this loan was extended until the end of the 2022–23 season. He made 16 appearances for Oldham; captain Liam Hogan and manager David Unsworth both said that he made an invaluable contribution to improving standards in training.

=== Later career ===
On 28 July 2023, Clarke signed with newly promoted National League North club Warrington Town following a trial period; manager Mark Beesley looked to add competition to centre-back pairing Evan Gumbs and Tom Hannigan. He played 42 of the club's 46 league games in the 2023–24 campaign. He also worked as a member of the Professional Footballers' Association (PFA) Player Services division. He played 32 games in the 2024–25 season, which ended in relegation for Warrington.

On 30 May 2025, Clarke joined Northern Premier League Premier Division club Prescot Cables. He made the 1,000th appearance of his career on 18 October, in a 2–1 defeat to Stocksbridge Park Steels, this feat having been prematurely reported by a number of media outlets one week prior. Prescot were relegated at the end of the 2025–26 season.

== International career ==
Clarke represented his county at all youth levels, having gained England under-21 honours and captained England from Under-16 to Under-21 levels. He made his debut for the England Under-21 team in 2002 as a substitute against Slovakia Under-21s. He gained eight caps for the under-21 side between 2002 and 2003.

== Style of play ==
Clarke is a defender with power and good aerial ability. According to The Athletic, he has also "mastered the dark arts" of "time-wasting, physical battles with forwards and words with referees".

== Personal life ==
Clarke has four children as of 2022. His mother and father attended every game he played until the COVID-19 pandemic caused games to be played behind closed doors.

== Career statistics ==
As of match played 15 August 2026

Appearances and goals by club, season and competition
Season	Club	League			FA Cup		League Cup		Other		Total	
Season	Club	Division	Apps	Goals	Apps	Goals	Apps	Goals	Apps	Goals	Apps	Goals
Everton	1998–99	Premier League	0	0	0	0	0	0	—		0	0
Everton	1999–2000	Premier League	0	0	0	0	0	0	—		0	0
Everton	2000–01	Premier League	1	0	0	0	0	0	—		1	0
Everton	2001–02	Premier League	7	0	3	0	0	0	—		10	0
Everton	2002–03	Premier League	0	0	1	0	0	0	—		1	0
Everton	2003–04	Premier League	1	0	0	0	1	0	—		2	0
Everton	Total		9	0	4	0	1	0	0	0	14	0
Blackpool (loan)	2002–03	Second Division	16	3	0	0	0	0	0	0	16	3
Port Vale (loan)	2002–03	Second Division	13	1	—		—		—		13	1
Coventry City (loan)	2003–04	First Division	5	0	—		—		—		5	0
Blackpool	2004–05	League One	38	5	4	1	0	0	1 (Note: Appearances in Football League Trophy / EFL Trophy)	0	43	6
Blackpool	2005–06	League One	46	6	1	1	2	1	1	0	50	8
Blackpool	Total		84	11	5	2	2	1	2	0	93	14
Southend United	2006–07	Championship	38	2	3	0	4	0	—		45	2
Southend United	2007–08	League One	45	4	5	0	2	0	3 (Note: One appearance in Football League Trophy, two appearances in League One play-offs)	0	55	4
Southend United	2008–09	League One	43	4	5	1	1	0	1	0	50	5
Southend United	Total		126	10	13	1	7	0	4	0	150	11
Huddersfield Town	2009–10	League One	46	5	3	0	2	0	3 (Note: One appearance and one goal in Football League Trophy, two appearances in League One play-offs)	1	54	6
Huddersfield Town	2010–11	League One	46	4	5	0	2	0	6 (Note: Three appearances in Football League Trophy, three appearances in League One play-offs)	0	59	4
Huddersfield Town	2011–12	League One	31	0	0	0	1	0	4 (Note: One appearance one goal in Football League Trophy, three appearances in League One play-offs)	1	36	1
Huddersfield Town	2012–13	Championship	43	0	3	0	1	0	—		47	0
Huddersfield Town	2013–14	Championship	26	0	0	0	2	0	—		28	0
Huddersfield Town	Total		192	9	11	0	8	0	13	2	224	11
Blackpool	2014–15	Championship	39	2	1	0	1	0	—		41	2
Bury	2015–16	League One	45	1	3	0	2	0	0	0	50	1
Oldham Athletic	2016–17	League One	46	5	2	1	2	0	3	0	53	6
Oldham Athletic	2017–18	League One	19	2	1	1	1	0	1	0	22	3
Oldham Athletic	2018–19	League Two	42	3	4	2	0	0	3	1	49	6
Oldham Athletic	Total		107	10	7	4	3	0	7	1	124	15
Bury (loan)	2017–18	League One	18	1	—		—		0	0	18	1
Fleetwood Town	2019–20	League One	12	1	0	0	1	0	4	2	17	3
Tranmere Rovers	2019–20	League One	6	0	3	0	—		0	0	9	0
Tranmere Rovers	2020–21	League Two	46	3	2	1	1	0	5 (Note: Three appearances in Football League Trophy, two appearances one goal in League Two play-offs)	1	54	5
Tranmere Rovers	2021–22	League Two	46	4	2	0	1	0	2	0	51	4
Tranmere Rovers	Total		98	7	7	1	2	0	7	1	114	9
Walsall	2022–23	League Two	14	0	1	0	0	0	1	0	16	0
Oldham Athletic (loan)	2022–23	National League	16	2	0	0	—		2 (Note: Appearances in FA Trophy)	1	18	3
Warrington Town	2023–24	National League North	42	2	0	0	—		0	0	42	2
Warrington Town	2024–25	National League North	31	0	0	0	—		1	0	32	0
Warrington Town	Total		73	2	0	0	0	0	1	0	74	2
Prescot Cables	2025–26	Northern Premier League; Premier Division	26	0	1	0	—		2	0	29	0
Prescot Cables	2026–27	Northern Premier League; Division One West	3	0	0	0	—		0	0	3	0
Prescot Cables	Total		29	0	1	0	0	0	2	0	32	0
Career total			896	60	54	8	27	1	42	7	1,019	76

== Honours ==
Huddersfield Town

- Football League One play-offs: 2012

Tranmere Rovers

- EFL Trophy runner-up: 2020–21

Individual

- PFA Fans' Player of the Year: 2010–11 League One
- Blackpool Player of the Season: 2004–05
- Southend United Player of the Season: 2008–09
- Huddersfield Town Player of the Season: 2009–10, 2010–11
- Bury Player of the Season: 2015–16
- Oldham Athletic Player of the Season: 2016–17, 2018–19
- EFL League Two Team of the Season: 2021–22
- PFA Team of the Year: 2021–22 League Two

== See also ==
- List of men's footballers with 1,000 or more official appearances
