= Stephen Hughes (footballer, born 1976) =

English footballer and pundit

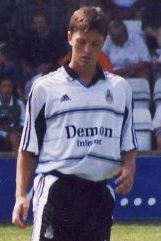
- Hughes with Fulham in 1999

Personal information
- Full name: Stephen John Hughes
- Date of birth: 18 September 1976 (age 50)
- Place of birth: Reading, England
- Height: 6 ft 0 in (1.83 m)
- Position: Midfielder

Youth career
- –1995: Arsenal

Senior career*
| Years | Team | Apps | (Gls) |
| 1995–2000 | Arsenal | 49 | (4) |
| 1999 | → Fulham (loan) | 3 | (0) |
| 2000–2001 | Everton | 29 | (1) |
| 2001–2003 | Watford | 15 | (0) |
| 2003–2004 | Charlton Athletic | 0 | (0) |
| 2004–2008 | Coventry City | 133 | (6) |
| 2008–2009 | Walsall | 32 | (2) |
| Total | | 261 | (13) |

International career
| 1994 | England U18 | 4 | (1) |
| 1997–1998 | England U21 | 8 | (0) |
- * Club domestic league appearances and goals

Stephen John Hughes (born 18 September 1976) is an English former professional footballer and pundit.

He played as a midfielder, notably in the Premier League for Arsenal, Everton and Charlton Athletic, and in the Football League for Fulham, Watford, Coventry City and Walsall. He was capped at both England U18 and U21 levels.

== Club career ==
Hughes started his career at Arsenal, with whom he won the FA Youth Cup in 1994. He then made 16 first team appearances to earn a winners medal as Arsenal won the 1998 Premier League title. Hughes' highlight for that season was scoring twice as Arsenal defeated Chelsea 2–0 at Highbury. He also made six appearances in Arsenal's FA Cup run that season, including the semi-final against Wolves, but was left out of the squad for the 1998 FA Cup final as they clinched the double. Another highlight was a 25-yard last minute equaliser against Leicester City at Filbert Street the following season. Altogether with Arsenal he made 76 senior appearances with 40 of them as a substitute, and scored seven goals.

Hughes then moved to Everton in March 2000, for a fee of £3 million. He played 33 games for them before being released on a free transfer on 4 July 2001. He then moved on to First Division side Watford that same month, having scored his two Everton goals against them; once in the league and once in the FA Cup. He only managed 17 games in his first season due to injury. His contract was settled early in the 2002–03 season.

He signed for Charlton Athletic in August 2003. but made no appearances that season and subsequently left on a free transfer to join Coventry City in July 2004. He went on to become the club's captain and make 144 appearances.

== Personal life ==
After his retirement from football, Hughes returned to the Gunners as a commentator and pundit for Arsenal Player.

== Career statistics ==
| Club | Season | Division | League | | FA Cup | | League Cup | | Europe | | Other¹ | | Total | |
| Club | Season | Division | Apps | Goals | Apps | Goals | Apps | Goals | Apps | Goals | Apps | Goals | Apps | Goals |
|---|---|---|---|---|---|---|---|---|---|---|---|---|---|---|
| Arsenal | 1994–95 | Premier League | 1 | 0 | 0 | 0 | 0 | 0 | 0 | 0 | – | – | 1 | 0 |
| Arsenal | 1995–96 | Premier League | 1 | 0 | 0 | 0 | 0 | 0 | – | – | – | – | 1 | 0 |
| Arsenal | 1996–97 | Premier League | 14 | 1 | 2 | 1 | 0 | 0 | 0 | 0 | – | – | 16 | 2 |
| Arsenal | 1997–98 | Premier League | 17 | 2 | 6 | 0 | 5 | 1 | 0 | 0 | – | – | 28 | 3 |
| Arsenal | 1998–99 | Premier League | 14 | 1 | 4 | 0 | 2 | 0 | 4 | 1 | 1 | 0 | 25 | 2 |
| Arsenal | 1999–2000 | Premier League | 2 | 0 | 2 | 0 | 0 | 0 | 1 | 0 | 0 | 0 | 5 | 0 |
| Arsenal | Arsenal total | | 49 | 4 | 14 | 1 | 7 | 1 | 5 | 1 | 1 | 0 | 76 | 7 |
| Fulham (loan) | 1999–2000 | First Division | 3 | 0 | 0 | 0 | 1 | 0 | – | – | – | – | 4 | 0 |
| Everton | 1999–2000 | Premier League | 11 | 1 | 0 | 0 | 0 | 0 | – | – | – | – | 11 | 1 |
| Everton | 2000–01 | Premier League | 18 | 0 | 2 | 1 | 2 | 0 | – | – | – | – | 22 | 1 |
| Everton | Everton total | | 29 | 1 | 2 | 1 | 3 | 0 | 0 | 0 | 0 | 0 | 33 | 2 |
| Watford | 2001–02 | First Division | 15 | 0 | 0 | 0 | 2 | 0 | – | – | – | – | 17 | 0 |
| Watford | 2002–03 | First Division | 0 | 0 | 0 | 0 | 0 | 0 | – | – | – | – | 0 | 0 |
| Watford | Watford total | | 15 | 0 | 0 | 0 | 2 | 0 | 0 | 0 | 0 | 0 | 17 | 0 |
| Charlton Athletic | 2003–04 | Premier League | 0 | 0 | 0 | 0 | 0 | 0 | – | – | – | – | 0 | 0 |
| Coventry City | 2004–05 | Championship | 40 | 4 | 2 | 0 | 2 | 1 | – | – | – | – | 44 | 5 |
| Coventry City | 2005–06 | Championship | 19 | 0 | 1 | 0 | 1 | 0 | – | – | – | – | 21 | 0 |
| Coventry City | 2006–07 | Championship | 37 | 1 | 0 | 0 | 1 | 0 | – | – | – | – | 38 | 1 |
| Coventry City | 2007–08 | Championship | 37 | 1 | 1 | 1 | 3 | 0 | – | – | – | – | 41 | 2 |
| Coventry City | Coventry City total | | 133 | 6 | 4 | 1 | 7 | 1 | 0 | 0 | 0 | 0 | 144 | 8 |
| Walsall | 2008–09 | League One | 32 | 2 | 1 | 0 | 1 | 0 | – | – | 2 | 0 | 41 | 2 |
| Career total | | | 261 | 13 | 21 | 3 | 21 | 2 | 5 | 1 | 3 | 0 | 315 | 19 |

¹ includes FA Charity Shield and Football League Trophy.

== Honours ==
Arsenal

- Premier League: 1997–98
- FA Charity Shield: 1998
- FA Youth Cup: 1993–94

Individual

- Coventry City Player of the Year: 2004–05
- Coventry City Players' Player of the Year: 2004–05
