= Tom Kearney (footballer) =

English footballer

Personal information
- Full name: Thomas James Kearney
- Date of birth: 7 October 1981 (age 45)
- Place of birth: Liverpool, England
- Position: Midfielder

Youth career
- Everton

Senior career*
Years	Team	Apps	(Gls)
2000–2002	Everton	0	(0)
2002–2006	Bradford City	54	(2)
2006–2008	Halifax Town	71	(1)
2008–2009	Wrexham	15	(1)
2009–2010	Altrincham	29	(2)
Total		169	(6)
- * Club domestic league appearances and goals as of 13:48, 13 July 2010 (UTC)

Thomas James Kearney (born 7 October 1981 in Liverpool) is an English former professional footballer who last played for Altrincham in the Conference National.

Halifax signed Tom Kearney in September 2006. He has played at Everton and Bradford City. In June 2008, he joined Conference National side Wrexham. He joined Conference National side Altrincham on 21 July 2009 after being released by Wrexham.

He retired from football after suffering a broken leg in a match against his former club Wrexham.

His sister is actress Gillian Kearney.

Following his retirement from football, he returned to Everton as an academy coach.
