= Peter Degn =

Danish footballer (born 1977)

Personal information
- Full name: Peter Degn
- Date of birth: 6 April 1977 (age 49)
- Place of birth: Ebeltoft, Denmark
- Height: 1.78 m (5 ft 10 in)
- Position: Midfielder

Senior career*
Years	Team	Apps	(Gls)
1994–1996	Ebeltoft IF	?	(?)
1996–1999	AGF	76	(3)
1999–2001	Everton	4	(0)
2000–2001	→ AGF (loan)	5	(2)
2001–2004	Brøndby	3	(0)
2002–2004	→ Vejle BK (loan)	30	(13)
2004–2010	Silkeborg IF	104	(22)
Total		222	(40)

International career
1996	Denmark U19	1	(0)
1996–1999	Denmark U21	25	(3)
- * Club domestic league appearances and goals as of May 9, 2010

Peter Degn (born 6 April 1977) is a Danish former professional footballer. He has played 25 games and scored three goals for the Denmark national under-21 football team.

== Biography ==
Born in Ebeltoft, Peter Degn started his career for local amateur team Ebeltoft IF in 1994. In 1996, he moved to Aarhus Gymnastik Forening (AGF) in the top-flight Danish Superliga championship. He got his national breakthrough in the 1996 Danish Cup final, when he scored the first goal in the 2–0 win against Brøndby IF. He was subsequently called up for the Danish national youth selections, and played a total 26 youth national games until December 1999.

In February 1999, Degn was bought by English club Everton in the top-flight FA Premier League. Never a success at Everton, he played four league games as a substitute in his two and a half seasons at the club. He was loaned out to his former club AGF in October 2000, but even though AGF wanted to sign a permanent transfer deal with Degn, they could not agree on the price with Everton. In July 2001, Degn moved back to Denmark, when he signed a four-year contract with Superliga team Brøndby IF.

Out of form, Degn did not find much playing time at Brøndby either. He was loaned out to Vejle Boldklub in the secondary Danish 1st Division in the fall 2002. He made his debut in September 2002, and quickly secured a place in Vejle's starting line-up. At the end of the season, Brøndby showed no interest in using Degn. He was loaned out to Vejle yet again, where he was named team captain. Having played little more than a year at Vejle, he moved back to the top-flight Superliga in January 2004, when he was bought by Silkeborg IF.

After retirement, Degn is now involved with childhood club, Ebeltoft I.F. He is also the owner of a pub in Ebeltoft.

== Achievements ==
- Danish Cup: 1996
