= 2003–04 Manchester City F.C. season =

English football club season

Manchester City
2003–04 season
- Owner: Publicly traded company
- Chairman: John Wardle
- Manager: Kevin Keegan
- Stadium: City of Manchester Stadium (a.k.a. Eastlands and CoMS)
- Premier League: 16th
- FA Cup: Fifth round
- League Cup: Fourth round
- UEFA Cup: Second round
- Top goalscorer: League: Nicolas Anelka (16); All: Nicolas Anelka (24)
- Highest home attendance: 47,269 v Chelsea; 28 February 2004
- Lowest home attendance: 29,067 v Sporting Lokeren; 24 September 2003
- Average home league attendance: 46,245 – over 19 PL home games (3rd highest in Premier League)
Home colours	Away colours

Results summary
All competitions
	Wins	Draws	Losses	Win %
Home	7	12	5	29.2%
Away	9	6	12	33.3%
Both	16	18	17	31.4%
Premier League
	Wins	Draws	Losses	Win %
Home	5	9	5	26.3%
Away	4	5	10	21.1%
Both	9	14	15	23.7%

The 2003–04 season was Manchester City Football Club's second consecutive season playing in the Premier League, the top division of English football, and its seventh season since the Premier League was first created with Manchester City as one of its original 22 founding member clubs. Overall, it was the team's 112th season playing in a division of English football, most of which have been spent in the top flight.

== Season review ==
After finishing ninth during the club's final season at 80-year-old Maine Road, Manchester City's debut season at the City of Manchester Stadium was a major disappointment. A ninth-place finish had not been good enough to earn City an opportunity to play in the UEFA Cup, but the team was rewarded with that opportunity anyway due to being awarded a "Fair Play" slot in the UEFA Cup competition this season. City reached the second round proper of the competition thanks to aggregate victories against The New Saints and Lokeren, but exited the competition on the away goals rule after two draws against Polish club Groclin.

Having embarked on a new era for the club by signing a host of experienced players in the summer, such as Claudio Reyna and Steve McManaman, to combine with such burgeoning talents coming through from the MCFC youth academy as Stephen Ireland and Shaun Wright-Phillips, City started their season very brightly with three wins in five games, sending them near the top of the table. They were still in the top-half of the table after winning five, drawing three and losing three of their first 11 games, with three notably big wins: a 3–0 opening-game away win at Charlton Athletic, a 4–1 home victory over Aston Villa and a 6–2 thumping of Bolton Wanderers. However, a dreadful 3–0 home defeat against unlikely opponents Leicester City in November started a gradual downturn in form and City then ended up battling against relegation. At one point, City went on a run of winning only one game out of 18 league and cup matches played, sparking media rumours of unrest in the squad. Survival in the Premier League was not confirmed until City won their 36th game of the league season. That victory meant that City were six points ahead of the relegation places, but the club's survival was effectively confirmed due to it having a far superior goal difference to Leicester, Leeds and Wolves, who were relegated.

Perhaps the most memorable game played by Manchester City during this season was the FA Cup fourth-round replay fixture against Tottenham Hotspur at White Hart Lane, which featured what many people consider to be one of the most extraordinary comebacks in the history of the competition. City fell three goals behind during the first half, had Nicolas Anelka substituted due to injury and Joey Barton was sent off during half-time for verbally abusing the referee. Despite having one man less than their opponents during the second half, City came all the way back to win 4–3 and reach the next round. Rookie Icelandic goalkeeper Árni Arason made a key double save and Jon Macken scored the winning goal. In the next round, a Manchester derby at Old Trafford, City lost 4–2 to exit the competition.

== Team kit ==
There was a change in the producer of the team kits for this season, with Reebok replacing the previous season's supplier, Le Coq Sportif. The shirt sponsorship was provided by the financial and legal services group First Advice, who had also been the sponsors for the previous season.

Home	Home (version 2)	Home (version 3)	Away

== First-team squad ==
Note: Flags indicate national team as defined under FIFA eligibility rules; some limited exceptions apply. Players may hold more than one non-FIFA nationality.

No.	Pos.	Nation	Player
1	GK	ENG	David James
2	DF	FRA	David Sommeil
3	DF	BEL	Daniel Van Buyten (on loan from Marseille)
4	DF	NED	Gerard Wiekens
5	DF	FRA	Sylvain Distin
8	FW	ENG	Robbie Fowler
9	FW	CRC	Paulo Wanchope
10	MF	FRA	Antoine Sibierski
11	FW	ENG	Jon Macken
12	GK	ENG	Nicky Weaver
17	DF	CHN	Sun Jihai
18	DF	GER	Michael Tarnat
19	MF	AUS	Danny Tiatto
20	MF	ENG	Steve McManaman
22	DF	IRL	Richard Dunne

No.	Pos.	Nation	Player
24	MF	ENG	Joey Barton
25	GK	ISL	Árni Gautur Arason
26	MF	NED	Paul Bosvelt
27	DF	DEN	Mikkel Bischoff
28	MF	ENG	Trevor Sinclair
29	MF	ENG	Shaun Wright-Phillips
30	MF	FRA	Christian Negouai
32	GK	DEN	Kevin Stuhr-Ellegaard
33	GK	DEN	Kasper Schmeichel
39	FW	FRA	Nicolas Anelka
41	DF	ENG	Stephen Jordan
42	MF	IRL	Glenn Whelan
43	DF	IRL	Paddy McCarthy
44	MF	IRL	Willo Flood
45	FW	IRL	Stephen Elliott

=== Left club during season ===
Note: Flags indicate national team as defined under FIFA eligibility rules; some limited exceptions apply. Players may hold more than one non-FIFA nationality.

No.	Pos.	Nation	Player
1	GK	ENG	David Seaman (retired)
7	FW	ENG	Darren Huckerby (to Norwich City)
14	MF	ISR	Eyal Berkovic (to Portsmouth)
15	DF	NOR	Alf-Inge Haaland (retired)

No.	Pos.	Nation	Player
16	DF	SCO	Paul Ritchie (to Walsall)
25	DF	CMR	Lucien Mettomo (to Kaiserslautern)
40	MF	ENG	Chris Shuker (to Barnsley)

== Historical league performance ==
Prior to this season, the history of Manchester City's performance in the English football league hierarchy since the creation of the Premier League in 1992 is summarised by the following timeline chart – which commences with the last season (1991–92) of the old Football League First Division (from which the Premier League was formed).

== Friendly games ==
=== Pre-season ===
19 July 2003	Mansfield	2–1	Manchester City	Mansfield, England
	Larkin 37'; Corden 57'	Sporting Life report	39' Anelka	Stadium: Field Mill; Attendance: 7,000

22 July 2003	Odense	1–0	Manchester City	Odense, Denmark
	Miti 75'	Sporting Life report		Stadium: Odense Stadion

25 July 2003	Feyenoord	1–2	Manchester City	Århus, Denmark
	Lazovic	Sporting Life report	Anelka; 88' Wanchope	Stadium: Atletion

29 July 2003	Lincoln City	2–2	Manchester City	Lincoln, England
	Mayo; Bloomer	Sporting Life report	Wanchope; Anelka	Stadium: Sincil Bank

2 August 2003	Oldham Athletic	0–6	Manchester City	Oldham, England
		Sporting Life report	23' Anelka; Sinclair; Fowler; Anelka; Wright-Phillips; Wanchope	Stadium: Boundary Park

4 August 2003	Rochdale	0–4	Manchester City	Rochdale, England
		BBC Sport report	25' Wright-Phillips; Anelka; Horlock; Shuker	Stadium: Spotland Stadium; Attendance: 5,500

==== First game ever played at CoMS ====
10 August 2003	Manchester City	2–1	Barcelona	Manchester, England
	Anelka 35'; Sinclair 67'	Sporting Life report YouTube video	58' Saviola	Stadium: City of Manchester Stadium; Attendance: 36,500

== Competitive games ==
=== Premier League ===
==== Table ====
Pos	Team	Pld	W	D	L	GF	GA	GD	Pts	Qualification or relegation
14	Tottenham Hotspur	38	13	6	19	47	57	−10	45	
15	Blackburn Rovers	38	12	8	18	51	59	−8	44	
16	Manchester City	38	9	14	15	55	54	+1	41	
17	Everton	38	9	12	17	45	57	−12	39	
18	Leicester City (R)	38	6	15	17	48	65	−17	33	Relegation to the Football League Championship

Source: Premier League
Rules for classification: 1) points; 2) goal difference; 3) number of goals scored.
(R) Relegated

==== Results summary ====
Overall								Home						Away					
Pld	W	D	L	GF	GA	GD	Pts	W	D	L	GF	GA	GD	W	D	L	GF	GA	GD
38	9	14	15	55	54	+1	41	5	9	5	31	24	+7	4	5	10	24	30	−6

Last updated: 15 May 2004 (end of season).
Source: Premier League results 2003–04

==== Points breakdown ====
Points at home: 24
Points away from home: 17

Points against "Big Four" teams: 4
Points against promoted teams: 3

6 points: Bolton Wanderers
4 points: Aston Villa, Blackburn Rovers, Charlton Athletic, Everton
3 points: Manchester United, Newcastle United, Southampton
2 points: Fulham, Tottenham Hotspur
1 point: Birmingham City, Leeds United, Leicester City, Liverpool,

Portsmouth, Wolverhampton Wanderers

0 points: Arsenal, Chelsea, Middlesbrough

==== Biggest & smallest ====
Biggest home wins: 6–2 vs. Bolton Wanderers, 18 October 2003
5–1 vs. Everton, 15 May 2004
Biggest home defeat: 0–3 vs. Leicester City, 9 November 2003
Biggest away win: 0–3 vs. Charlton Athletic, 17 August 2003
Biggest away defeat: 3–0 vs. Newcastle United, 22 November 2003

Biggest home attendance: 47,304 vs. Chelsea, 28 February 2004
Smallest home attendance: 44,307 vs. Charlton Athletic, 7 January 2004
Biggest away attendance: 67,645 vs. Manchester United, 13 December 2003
Smallest away attendance: 16,124 vs. Fulham, 20 September 2003

==== Results by round ====
Round	1	2	3	4	5	6	7	8	9	10	11	12	13	14	15	16	17	18	19	20	21	22	23	24	25	26	27	28	29	30	31	32	33	34	35	36	37	38
Ground	A	H	A	H	H	A	H	A	H	A	A	H	A	H	A	A	H	A	H	H	A	H	A	H	A	A	H	H	A	H	A	H	A	H	A	H	A	H
Result	W	D	W	L	W	D	D	L	W	L	W	L	L	L	D	L	D	L	D	D	L	D	L	D	L	W	L	W	L	D	D	D	D	L	D	W	L	W

Source: 2003–04 Premier League results
A = Away; H = Home; W = Win; D = Draw; L = Loss

==== Individual match reports ====
17 August 2003	Charlton Athletic	0–3	Manchester City	London
14:00		Sporting Life report	13' (pen.) Anelka; 23' Sibierski; 83' Sun	Stadium: The Valley; Attendance: 25,780; Referee: M. Dean (Wirral)

23 August 2003	Manchester City	1–1	Portsmouth	Manchester
15:00	Sommeil 90'	Sporting Life report	24' Yakubu	Stadium: City of Manchester Stadium; Attendance: 46,287; Referee: M. Messias (N. Yorkshire)

25 August 2003	Blackburn Rovers	2–3	Manchester City	Blackburn
20:00	Sinclair 44' (o.g.); Amoruso 61'	Sporting Life report	4' Tarnat; 59' Barton; 87' Anelka	Stadium: Ewood Park; Attendance: 23,361; Referee: A. Wiley (Staffordshire)

31 August 2003	Manchester City	1–2	Arsenal	Manchester
16:05	Lauren 10' (o.g.)	Sporting Life report	48' Wiltord; 72' Ljungberg	Stadium: City of Manchester Stadium; Attendance: 46,436; Referee: G. Poll (Hertfordshire)

14 September 2003	Manchester City	4–1	Aston Villa	Manchester
14:00	Anelka 48' (pen.); Tarnat 50'; Anelka 68' (pen.); Anelka 83'	Sporting Life report	31' Angel	Stadium: City of Manchester Stadium; Attendance: 46,687; Referee: M. Halsey (Lancashire)

20 September 2003	Fulham	2–2	Manchester City	London
15:00	Malbranque 73'; Saha 79'	Sporting Life report	46' (o.g.) Knight; 90' Wanchope	Stadium: Loftus Road; Attendance: 16,124; Referee: P. Dowd (Staffordshire)

28 September 2003	Manchester City	0–0	Tottenham Hotspur	Manchester
16:05		Sporting Life report		Stadium: City of Manchester Stadium; Attendance: 46,842; Referee: N. Barry (N. Lincolnshire)

4 October 2003	Wolverhampton Wanderers	1–0	Manchester City	Wolverhampton
15:00	Cameron 75'	Sporting Life report		Stadium: Molineux Stadium; Attendance: 29,386; Referee: J. Winter (Cleveland)

18 October 2003	Manchester City	6–2	Bolton Wanderers	Manchester
15:00	Wright-Phillips 27'; Distin 48'; Wright-Phillips 56'; Anelka 58'; Wright-Phillips (yellow card) (red card) 62'; Anelka 72'; Reyna 84'	Sporting Life report	25' Nolan; 60' Campo	Stadium: City of Manchester Stadium; Attendance: 47,101; Referee: S. Bennett (Kent)

25 October 2003	Chelsea	1–0	Manchester City	London
15:00	Hasselbaink 34'	Sporting Life report		Stadium: Stamford Bridge; Attendance: 41,040; Referee: P. Dowd (Staffordshire)

1 November 2003	Southampton	0–2	Manchester City	Southampton
15:00		Sporting Life report	4' Fowler; 85' Wanchope	Stadium: St Mary's Stadium; Attendance: 31,952; Referee: A. Wiley (Staffordshire)

9 November 2003	Manchester City	0–3	Leicester City	Manchester
15:00		Sporting Life report	12' Stewart; 53' (pen.) Dickov; 58' Bent	Stadium: City of Manchester Stadium; Attendance: 46,966; Referee: M. Riley (W. Yorkshire)

22 November 2003	Newcastle United	3–0	Manchester City	Newcastle
15:00	Ameobi 57'; Shearer 77' 85'	Sporting Life report		Stadium: St James' Park; Attendance: 52,159; Referee: N. Barry (N. Lincolnshire)

30 November 2003	Manchester City	0–1	Middlesbrough	Manchester
15:00		Sporting Life report	30' (o.g.) Jihai	Stadium: City of Manchester Stadium; Attendance: 46,824; Referee: M. Riley (W. Yorkshire)

7 December 2003	Everton	0–0	Manchester City	Liverpool
14:00		Sporting Life report		Stadium: Goodison Park; Attendance: 37,871; Referee: J. Winter (Cleveland)

13 December 2003	Manchester United	3–1	Manchester City	Manchester
12:30	Scholes 7' van Nistelrooy 34'; Scholes 73'	Sporting Life report	52' Wright-Phillips	Stadium: Old Trafford; Attendance: 67,645; Referee: M. Halsey (Lancashire)

22 December 2003	Manchester City	1–1	Leeds United	Manchester
20:00	Sibierski 82'	Sporting Life report	24' Viduka	Stadium: City of Manchester Stadium; Attendance: 47,126; Referee: G. Barber (Hertfordshire)

26 December 2003	Birmingham City	2–1	Manchester City	Birmingham
15:00	Kenna 81'; Forssell 87'	Sporting Life report	14' Fowler	Stadium: St. Andrews; Attendance: 29,520; Referee: U. Rennie (S. Yorkshire)

28 December 2003	Manchester City	2–2	Liverpool	Manchester
15:00	Anelka 30' (pen.); Fowler 90'	Sporting Life report	66' Šmicer; 80' Hamann	Stadium: City of Manchester Stadium; Attendance: 47,201; Referee: M. Riley (W. Yorkshire)

7 January 2004	Manchester City	1–1	Charlton Athletic	Manchester
19:45	Fowler 39'	Sporting Life report	84' Di Canio	Stadium: City of Manchester Stadium; Attendance: 44,307; Referee: P. Walton (Northamptonshire)

10 January 2004	Portsmouth	4–2	Manchester City	Portsmouth
15:00	Stefanovic 19'; Yakubu 52'; Sheringham 58'; Yakubu 77'	Sporting Life report	21' Anelka; 45' Sibierski	Stadium: Fratton Park; Attendance: 20,120; Referee: M. Messias (N. Yorkshire)

17 January 2004	Manchester City	1–1	Blackburn Rovers	Manchester
15:00	Anelka 50'	Sporting Life report	55' Flitcroft	Stadium: City of Manchester Stadium; Attendance: 47,090; Referee: M. Dean (Wirral)

1 February 2004	Arsenal	2–1	Manchester City	London
16:05	Tarnat 39' (o.g.); Henry 83'	Sporting Life report	89' Anelka	Stadium: Highbury; Attendance: 38,103; Referee: A. Wiley (Staffordshire)

8 February 2004	Manchester City	0–0	Birmingham City	Manchester
14:00		Sporting Life report		Stadium: City of Manchester Stadium; Attendance: 46,967; Referee: P. Durkin (Dorset)

11 February 2004	Liverpool	2–1	Manchester City	Liverpool
20:00	Owen 3'; Gerrard 51'	Sporting Life report	50' Wright-Phillips	Stadium: Anfield; Attendance: 43,257; Referee: M. Riley (W. Yorkshire)

21 February 2004	Bolton Wanderers	1–3	Manchester City	Bolton
15:00	Nolan 22'	Sporting Life report	27' 31' Fowler; 50' (o.g.) Charlton	Stadium: Reebok Stadium; Attendance: 27,301; Referee: S. Dunn (Gloucestershire)

28 February 2004	Manchester City	0–1	Chelsea	Manchester
15:00		Sporting Life report	82' Guðjohnsen	Stadium: City of Manchester Stadium; Attendance: 47,304; Referee: R. Styles (Hampshire)

14 March 2004	Manchester City	4–1	Manchester United	Manchester
14:00	Fowler 3'; Macken 32'; Sinclair 73'; Wright-Phillips 90'	Sporting Life report YouTube video	35' Scholes	Stadium: City of Manchester Stadium; Attendance: 47,284; Referee: S. Bennett (Kent)

22 March 2004	Leeds United	2–1	Manchester City	Leeds
20:00	McPhail 23'; Viduka 76' (pen.)	Sporting Life report	44' Anelka	Stadium: Elland Road; Attendance: 36,998; Referee: A. Wiley (Staffordshire)

27 March 2004	Manchester City	0–0	Fulham	Manchester
15:00		Sporting Life report		Stadium: City of Manchester Stadium; Attendance: 46,522; Referee: J. Winter (Cleveland)

4 April 2004	Aston Villa	1–1	Manchester City	Birmingham
14:00	Angel 26'	Sporting Life report	82' Distin	Stadium: Villa Park; Attendance: 37,602; Referee: U. Rennie (S. Yorkshire)

10 April 2004	Manchester City	3–3	Wolverhampton Wanderers	Manchester
15:00	Anelka 25'; Sibierski 39'; Wright-Phillips 90'	Sporting Life report	13' Kennedy; 23' Cort; 78' Camara	Stadium: City of Manchester Stadium; Attendance: 47,248; Referee: J. Winter (Cleveland)

12 April 2004	Tottenham Hotspur	1–1	Manchester City	London
15:00	Defoe 52'	Sporting Life report	25' Anelka	Stadium: White Hart Lane; Attendance: 35,282; Referee: C. Foy (Merseyside)

17 April 2004	Manchester City	1–3	Southampton	Manchester
15:00	Anelka 78'	Sporting Life report	34' Beattie; 55' 81' Phillips	Stadium: City of Manchester Stadium; Attendance: 47,152; Referee: G. Barber (Hertfordshire)

24 April 2004	Leicester City	1–1	Manchester City	Leicester
15:00	Scowcroft 66'	Sporting Life report	45' Tarnat	Stadium: Walkers Stadium; Attendance: 31,457; Referee: A. D'Urso (Essex)

1 May 2004	Manchester City	1–0	Newcastle United	Manchester
15:00	Wanchope 59'	Sporting Life report		Stadium: City of Manchester Stadium; Attendance: 47,226; Referee: M. Halsey (Lancashire)

8 May 2004	Middlesbrough	2–1	Manchester City	Middlesbrough
15:00	Maccarone 8'; Nemeth 32'	Sporting Life report	35' Wanchope	Stadium: Riverside Stadium; Attendance: 34,734; Referee: M. Riley (W. Yorkshire)

15 May 2004	Manchester City	5–1	Everton	Manchester
15:00	Wanchope 16' 30'; Anelka 41'; Sibierski 89'; Wright-Phillips 90'	Sporting Life report	60' Campbell	Stadium: City of Manchester Stadium; Attendance: 47,284; Referee: S. Dunn (Gloucestershire)

=== UEFA Cup ===
14 August 2003 Qualifying (1st Leg)	Manchester City (England)	5–0	(Wales) Total Network Solutions	Manchester, England
	Sinclair 14'; Wright-Phillips 51'; Sun 60'; Sommeil 74'; Anelka 87'	Sporting Life report		Stadium: City of Manchester Stadium; Attendance: 34,103; Referee: Alexey Tiumin (Russia)

28 August 2003 Qualifying (2nd Leg)	Total Network Solutions (Wales)	0–2	(England) Manchester City	Cardiff, Wales
		Sporting Life report	41' Negouai; Huckerby	Stadium: Millennium Stadium; Referee: Zsolt Szabo (Hungary)

24 September 2003 Round 1 (1st Leg)	Manchester City (England)	3–2	(Belgium) Sporting Lokeren	Manchester, England
	Sibierski 8'; Fowler 77'; Anelka 80' (pen.)	Sporting Life report	14' Zoundi; 40' Kristinsson	Stadium: City of Manchester Stadium; Attendance: 29,067; Referee: Grzegorz Gilewski (Poland)

15 October 2003 Round 1 (2nd Leg)	Sporting Lokeren (Belgium)	0–1	(England) Manchester City	Lokeren, Belgium
		Sporting Life report	19' (pen.) Anelka	Stadium: Daknamstadion; Attendance: 10,000; Referee: Damien Ledentu (France)

6 November 2003 Round 2 (1st Leg)	Manchester City (England)	1–1	(Poland) Groclin Dyskobolia	Manchester, England
	Anelka 6'	Sporting Life report	65' Mila	Stadium: City of Manchester Stadium; Attendance: 32,506; Referee: G. Kaznaferis (Greece)

27 November 2003 Round 2 (2nd Leg)	Groclin Dyskobolia (Poland)	0–0	(England) Manchester City	Grodzisk Wielkopolski, Poland
		Sporting Life report		Stadium: Stadion Dyskobolia; Attendance: 5,500; Referee: Peter Frojdfeldt (Sweden)

Final aggregate score 1–1 with Groclin progressing on away goals rule

=== League Cup ===
28 October 2003 Round 3	Queens Park Rangers	0–3	Manchester City	London
19:45		Sporting Life report	22' 77' Wright-Phillips; 79' Macken	Stadium: Loftus Road; Attendance: 16,773; Referee: S. Dunn (Gloucestershire)

3 December 2003 Round 4	Tottenham Hotspur	3–1	Manchester City	London
19:45	Anderton 9'; Postiga 30'; Kanouté 90'	Sporting Life report	80' Fowler	Stadium: White Hart Lane; Attendance: 31,727; Referee: P. Durkin (Dorset)

=== FA Cup ===
3 January 2004 Round 3	Manchester City	2–2	Leicester City	Manchester
15:00	Anelka 27' (pen.) 69'	Sporting Life report	4' Dickov; 66' Bent	Stadium: City of Manchester Stadium; Attendance: 30,617; Referee: G. Poll (Hertfordshire)

14 January 2004 Round 3 (replay)	Leicester City	1–3	Manchester City	Leicester
19:45	Ferdinand 73'	Sporting Life report	12' Sibierski; 90' Macken; 90' Anelka	Stadium: Walkers Stadium; Attendance: 18,916; Referee: G. Poll (Hertfordshire)

25 January 2004 Round 4	Manchester City	1–1	Tottenham Hotspur	Manchester
13:00	Anelka 11'	Sporting Life report	57' Doherty	Stadium: City of Manchester Stadium; Attendance: 34,000; Referee: S. Dunn (Gloucestershire)

4 February 2004 Round 4 (replay)	Tottenham Hotspur	3–4	Manchester City	London
19:45	King 2'; Keane 19'; Ziege 43'	Sporting Life report MCFC video	(yellow card) (red card) 45' Barton; 48' Distin; 69' Bosvelt; 80' Wright-Phillips; 90' Macken	Stadium: White Hart Lane; Attendance: 30,400; Referee: R. Styles (Hampshire)

14 February 2004 Round 5	Manchester United	4–2	Manchester City	Manchester
12:30	Scholes 34'; Neville (yellow card) (red card) 39' van Nistelrooy 71'; Ronaldo 74' van Nistelrooy 80'	Sporting Life report	78' Tarnat; 86' Fowler	Stadium: Old Trafford; Attendance: 67,228; Referee: J. Winter (Cleveland)

== Statistics ==
=== Appearances and goals ===
No.	Pos	Nat	Player	Total		Premier League		FA Cup		League Cup		UEFA Cup	
No.	Pos	Nat	Player	Apps	Goals	Apps	Goals	Apps	Goals	Apps	Goals	Apps	Goals
Goalkeepers
1	GK	(England) ENG	David James	18	0	17	0	1	0	0	0	0	0
12	GK	(England) ENG	Nicky Weaver	1	0	0	0	0	0	0	0	1	0
25	GK	(Iceland) ISL	Árni Gautur Arason	2	0	0	0	2	0	0	0	0	0
32	GK	(Denmark) DEN	Kevin Stuhr Ellegaard	5	0	2+2	0	0	0	1	0	0	0
Defenders
2	DF	(France) FRA	David Sommeil	25	2	18	1	2	0	1	0	4	1
3	DF	(Belgium) BEL	Daniel Van Buyten	6	0	5	0	1	0	0	0	0	0
4	DF	(Netherlands) NED	Gerard Wiekens	1	0	0	0	0	0	0	0	1	0
5	DF	(France) FRA	Sylvain Distin	50	3	38	2	5	1	2	0	5	0
17	DF	(China) CHN	Sun Jihai	42	2	29+4	1	3	0	1	0	5	1
18	DF	(Germany) GER	Michael Tarnat	41	4	32	3	4	1	2	0	3	0
22	DF	(Republic of Ireland) IRL	Richard Dunne	40	0	28+1	0	5	0	2	0	3+1	0
27	DF	(Denmark) DEN	Mikkel Bischoff	1	0	0	0	0	0	0	0	0+1	0
41	DF	(England) ENG	Stephen Jordan	2	0	0+2	0	0	0	0	0	0	0
Midfielders
6	MF	(United States) USA	Claudio Reyna	31	1	19+4	1	3	0	1	0	2+2	0
19	MF	(Australia) AUS	Danny Tiatto	9	0	1+4	0	0	0	0	0	2+2	0
20	MF	(England) ENG	Steve McManaman	30	0	20+2	0	2+1	0	0+1	0	4	0
24	MF	(England) ENG	Joey Barton	39	1	24+4	1	3+1	0	2	0	2+3	0
26	MF	(Netherlands) NED	Paul Bosvelt	35	1	22+3	0	4	1	1	0	4+1	0
28	MF	(England) ENG	Trevor Sinclair	38	2	20+9	1	3+1	0	2	0	3	1
29	MF	(England) ENG	Shaun Wright-Phillips	46	11	32+2	7	3+1	1	2	2	4+2	1
30	MF	(France) FRA	Christian Negouai	1	1	0	0	0	0	0	0	1	1
42	MF	(Republic of Ireland) IRL	Glenn Whelan	1	0	0	0	0	0	0	0	0+1	0
44	MF	(Republic of Ireland) IRL	Willo Flood	1	0	0	0	0	0	0	0	1	0
Forwards
8	FW	(England) ENG	Robbie Fowler	41	10	23+8	7	4	1	2	1	4	1
9	FW	(Costa Rica) CRC	Paulo Wanchope	26	6	12+10	6	0	0	0	0	1+3	0
10	FW	(France) FRA	Antoine Sibierski	30	7	18+5	5	3+2	1	0+1	0	1	1
11	FW	(England) ENG	Jon Macken	21	4	7+8	1	1+2	2	0+1	1	1+1	0
39	FW	(France) FRA	Nicolas Anelka	43	24	31+1	16	4	4	2	0	5	4
45	FW	(Republic of Ireland) IRL	Stephen Elliott	2	0	0+2	0	0	0	0	0	0	0
Players transferred out during the season
1	GK	(England) ENG	David Seaman	26	0	19	0	1	0	1	0	5	0
7	FW	(England) ENG	Darren Huckerby	1	1	0	0	0	0	0	0	1	1
14	MF	(Israel) ISR	Eyal Berkovic	7	0	1+3	0	0	0	0+1	0	2	0

=== Starting 11 ===
No.	Pos.	Nat.	Name	MS	Notes
1	GK	(England)	David Seaman	26	
17	RB	(China)	Sun Jihai	38	
22	CB	(Republic of Ireland)	Richard Dunne	38	
5	CB	(France)	Sylvain Distin	50	
18	LB	(Germany)	Michael Tarnat	41	
28	RM	(England)	Trevor Sinclair	28	
24	CM	(England)	Joey Barton	31	Steve McManaman had 26 starts
26	CM	(Netherlands)	Paul Bosvelt	31	
29	LM	(England)	Shaun Wright-Phillips	41	
8	CF	(England)	Robbie Fowler	33	
39	CF	(France)	Nicolas Anelka	42	

== Goal scorers ==
=== All competitions ===
Scorer	Goals
(France) Nicolas Anelka	24
(England) Shaun Wright-Phillips	11
(England) Robbie Fowler	10
(France) Antoine Sibierski	7
(Costa Rica) Paulo Wanchope	6
(England) Jon Macken	4
(Germany) Michael Tarnat	4
(France) Sylvain Distin	3
(China) Sun Jihai	2
(England) Trevor Sinclair	2
(France) David Sommeil	2
(England) Joey Barton	1
(Netherlands) Paul Bosvelt	1
(England) Darren Huckerby	1
(France) Christian Negouai	1
(United States) Claudio Reyna	1

=== Premier League ===
Scorer	Goals
(France) Nicolas Anelka	16
(England) Robbie Fowler	7
(England) Shaun Wright-Phillips	7
(Costa Rica) Paulo Wanchope	6
(France) Antoine Sibierski	5
(Germany) Michael Tarnat	3
(France) Sylvain Distin	2
(England) Joey Barton	1
(China) Sun Jihai	1
(England) Jon Macken	1
(United States) (Portugal) Claudio Reyna	1
(France) David Sommeil	1
(England) Trevor Sinclair	1

=== UEFA Cup ===
Scorer	Goals
(France) Nicolas Anelka	4
(England) Robbie Fowler	1
(England) Darren Huckerby	1
(China) Sun Jihai	1
(France) Christian Negouai	1
(England) Shaun Wright-Phillips	1
(France) Antoine Sibierski	1
(England) Trevor Sinclair	1
(France) David Sommeil	1

=== League Cup and FA Cup ===
Scorer	Goals
(France) Nicolas Anelka	4
(England) Jon Macken	3
(England) Shaun Wright-Phillips	3
(England) Robbie Fowler	2
(Netherlands) Paul Bosvelt	1
(France) Sylvain Distin	1
(France) Antoine Sibierski	1
(Germany) Michael Tarnat	1

Information current as of 15 May 2004 (end of season)

== Transfers and loans ==
=== Transfers in ===
Date	Pos.	Player	From club	Transfer fee
4 June 2003	MF	(Germany) Michael Tarnat	(Germany) Bayern Munich	Free
21 June 2003	GK	(England) David Seaman	(England) Arsenal	Free
21 July 2003	MF	(England) Trevor Sinclair	(England) West Ham United	£2.5 million
24 July 2003	MF	(Netherlands) Paul Bosvelt	(Netherlands) Feyenoord	Undisclosed
2 August 2003	MF	(France) Antoine Sibierski	(France) Lens	£700,000
29 August 2003	MF	(United States) (Portugal) Claudio Reyna	(England) Sunderland	£2.5 million
30 August 2003	MF	(England) Steve McManaman	(Spain) Real Madrid	Free
14 January 2004	GK	(England) David James	(England) West Ham United	£2 million
Jan. 2004	GK	(Iceland) Árni Gautur Arason	(Norway) Rosenborg	Free

=== Transfers out ===
Exit date	Pos.	Player	To club	Transfer fee
May 2003		James Almond	Released	
May 2003		Mark Egerton	Released	
May 2003		Philip Gilder	Released	
May 2003		Adam James	Released	
May 2003		Adrian Orr	Released	
May 2003		David Tickle	Released	
May 2003		Ashley Timms	Released	
May 2003	FW	(Northern Ireland) Gary Browne	(England) Whitby Town	Released
May 2003	DF	(Republic of Ireland) Stephen Paisley	(Republic of Ireland) Longford Town	Released
23 May 2003	DF	(Netherlands Antilles) Tyrone Loran	(England) Tranmere Rovers	Undisclosed
5 June 2003	DF	(England) Steve Howey	(England) Leicester City	£200,000
8 July 2003	DF	(Denmark) Niclas Jensen	(Germany) Borussia Dortmund	£750,000
24 July 2003	GK	(Republic of Ireland) Brian Murphy	(Wales) Swansea City	Free
25 July 2003	DF	(Norway) Alf-Inge Haaland	Retired	
27 July 2003	MF	(Algeria) Ali Benarbia	(Qatar) Al-Rayyan	Free
1 August 2003	FW	(Bermuda) Shaun Goater	(England) Reading	£500,000
14 August 2003	GK	(England) Carlo Nash	(England) Middlesbrough	Nominal
15 August 2003	MF	(England) Kevin Horlock	(England) West Ham United	£300,000
22 August 2003	DF	(Scotland) Paul Ritchie	(England) Walsall	Free
25 August 2003	DF	(Cameroon) Lucien Mettomo	(Germany) Kaiserslautern	£500,000
26 December 2003	FW	(England) Darren Huckerby	(England) Norwich City	£750,000
8 January 2004	MF	(Israel) Eyal Berkovic	(England) Portsmouth	£500,000
15 January 2004	GK	(England) David Seaman	Retired	

=== Loans in ===
Date from	Date to	Pos.	Player	From club
31 Jan 2004	31 May 2004	DF	(Belgium) Daniel Van Buyten	(France) Marseille

=== Loans out ===
Date from	Date to	Pos.	Player	To club
3 July 2003	31 May 2004	FW	(Mexico) Matias Vuoso	(Mexico) Santos Laguna
7 Aug 2003	7 Nov 2003	MF	(England) Chris Shuker	(England) Rochdale
10 Sep 2003	12 Dec 3	FW	(England) Darren Huckerby	(England) Norwich City
29 Sep 2003	30 Oct 2003	MF	(Republic of Ireland) Glenn Whelan	(England) Bury
11 Dec 2003	??? 2004	MF	(England) Chris Shuker	(England) Hartlepool United
24 Dec 2003	24 Jan 2004	MF	(Republic of Ireland) Glenn Whelan	(England) Bury
Jan. 2004			(England) Daniel Bardiello	(England) Barnsley
31 Jan 2004	31 May 2004	DF	(Guadeloupe) David Sommeil	(France) Marseille
2 Feb 4			Dorryl Profitt	(England) Coventry City
		MF	(France) Christian Negouai	(Austria) Sturm Graz
15 Mar 2004	15 Apr 2004	MF	(Republic of Ireland) Willo Flood	(England) Rochdale
