= 2004–05 Manchester City F.C. season =

English football club season

Manchester City
2004–05 season
- Owner: Publicly traded company
- Chairman: John Wardle
- Manager: Kevin Keegan (until 11 March 2005); Stuart Pearce
- Stadium: City of Manchester Stadium (a.k.a. Eastlands and CoMS)
- Premier League: 8th
- FA Cup: Third round
- League Cup: Third round
- Top goalscorer: League: Shaun Wright-Phillips and Robbie Fowler (10); All: Shaun Wright-Phillips and Robbie Fowler (11)
- Highest home attendance: 47,221 v Middlesbrough; 15 May 2005
- Lowest home attendance: 19,578 v Barnsley; 21 September 2004
- Average home league attendance: 45,192
Home colours	Away colours	Third colours

Results summary – all competitions
	Wins	Draws	Losses	Win %
Home	9	6	6	42.9%
Away	5	7	8	25.0%
Both	14	13	14	34.1%

Results summary – Premier League
	Wins	Draws	Losses	Win %
Home	8	6	5	42.1%
Away	5	7	7	26.3%
Both	13	13	12	34.2%

The 2004–05 season was Manchester City Football Club's third consecutive season playing in the Premier League, the top division of English football, and its eighth season since the Premier League was first created with Manchester City as one of its original 22 founding member clubs. Overall, it was the team's 113th season playing in a division of English football, most of which have been spent in the top flight.

== Season review ==
In the 2004-05 Premier League season, Manchester City had a dramatic campaign, including important wins over Chelsea and Liverpool but also disappointing losses to West Bromwich Albion and Bolton. The season featured significant contributions from academy graduates, most notably Shaun Wright-Phillips, who was named in the PFA Team of the Year. Midseason managerial changes occurred: Kevin Keegan departed with the team mid-table, and Stuart Pearce took over in January. On the final day, City needed a win to secure European qualification, but despite a tense finish, they drew and missed out.

== Players ==
=== First-team squad ===
Note: Flags indicate national team as defined under FIFA eligibility rules; some limited exceptions apply. Players may hold more than one non-FIFA nationality.

No.	Pos.	Nation	Player
1	GK	ENG	David James
2	DF	FRA	David Sommeil
3	DF	WAL	Ben Thatcher
5	DF	FRA	Sylvain Distin
6	MF	USA	Claudio Reyna
8	FW	ENG	Robbie Fowler
10	MF	FRA	Antoine Sibierski
11	FW	IRL	Jon Macken
12	GK	ENG	Nicky Weaver
14	MF	NED	Kiki Musampa (on loan from Atlético Madrid)
16	DF	ENG	Nedum Onuoha
17	DF	CHN	Sun Jihai
18	DF	ENG	Danny Mills
20	MF	ENG	Steve McManaman
22	DF	IRL	Richard Dunne

No.	Pos.	Nation	Player
24	MF	ENG	Joey Barton
25	GK	BEL	Geert De Vlieger
26	MF	NED	Paul Bosvelt
27	DF	DEN	Mikkel Bischoff
28	MF	ENG	Trevor Sinclair
29	MF	ENG	Shaun Wright-Phillips
30	MF	FRA	Christian Negouai
31	DF	ENG	Jonathan D'Laryea
32	GK	DEN	Kevin Stuhr-Ellegaard
33	GK	DEN	Kasper Schmeichel
38	MF	IRL	Stephen Ireland
40	MF	ENG	Lee Croft
41	DF	ENG	Stephen Jordan
42	FW	ENG	Bradley Wright-Phillips
44	MF	IRL	Willo Flood

=== Left club during season ===
Note: Flags indicate national team as defined under FIFA eligibility rules; some limited exceptions apply. Players may hold more than one non-FIFA nationality.

No.	Pos.	Nation	Player
9	FW	CRC	Paulo Wanchope (to Málaga)
21	GK	NED	Ronald Waterreus (to Rangers)

No.	Pos.	Nation	Player
39	FW	FRA	Nicolas Anelka (to Fenerbahçe)
43	MF	IRL	Paddy McCarthy (to Leicester City)

== Team kit ==
The team kit was produced by Reebok and the shirt sponsor was Thomas Cook.

Home	Home alt.	Away	Away alt.	Third kit

== Historical league performance ==
Prior to this season, the history of Manchester City's performance in the English football league hierarchy since the creation of the Premier League in 1992 is summarised by the following timeline chart – which commences with the last season (1991–92) of the old Football League First Division (from which the Premier League was formed).

== Results ==
In this season, Manchester City, did not qualify for any European competitions. The team's leading Premier League goalscorers were Robbie Fowler and Shaun Wright-Phillips, who both ended up with 10 goals and tied for 15th.

== Pre-season ==
21 July 2004	Bury	0–0	Manchester City	Bury, England
20:00 BST		M.E.N. report		Stadium: Gigg Lane; Attendance: 7,412

2 August 2004	Reading	1–4	Manchester City	Reading, England
15:00 BST	Williams		Goal	Stadium: Madejski Stadium

=== Thomas Cook Trophy ===
7 August 2004	Manchester City	3–1	Lazio	Manchester, England
15:00 BST	Anelka 1'; Macken 68'; Sibierski 74' (pen.)	M.E.N. report	74' (pen.) Oddo	Stadium: City of Manchester Stadium; Attendance: 23,132; Referee: Matt Messias (England)

=== Premier League ===
==== Position in final standings ====
Pos	Team	Pld	W	D	L	GF	GA	GD	Pts	Qualification or relegation
6	Bolton Wanderers	38	16	10	12	49	44	+5	58	Qualification for the UEFA Cup first round (Note: Since the finalists of the FA Cup, Arsenal and Manchester United, as well as Chelsea, who won the 2004–05 Football League Cup, were qualified for the Champions League, and the fifth-placed team (Liverpool) were moved to the Champions League, the sixth and seventh-placed teams in the Premier League were rewarded entry to the UEFA Cup.)
7	Middlesbrough	38	14	13	11	53	46	+7	55	Qualification for the UEFA Cup first round
8	Manchester City	38	13	13	12	47	39	+8	52	
9	Tottenham Hotspur	38	14	10	14	47	41	+6	52	
10	Aston Villa	38	12	11	15	45	52	−7	47	

Rules for classification: 1) points; 2) goal difference; 3) number of goals scored.

==== Results summary ====
Overall								Home						Away					
Pld	W	D	L	GF	GA	GD	Pts	W	D	L	GF	GA	GD	W	D	L	GF	GA	GD
38	13	13	12	47	39	+8	52	8	6	5	24	14	+10	5	7	7	23	25	−2

Last updated: 15 May 2005 (end of season).
Source: Premier League results 2004–05

==== Points breakdown ====
Points at home: 30
Points away from home: 22

Points against "Big Four" teams: 9
Points against promoted teams: 11

6 points: Aston Villa, Crystal Palace, Portsmouth
4 points: Charlton Athletic, Chelsea, Norwich City, Southampton
3 points: Birmingham City, Bolton Wanderers, Liverpool
2 points: Blackburn Rovers, Fulham
1 point: Arsenal, Manchester United, Middlesbrough, Newcastle United,

West Bromwich Albion

0 points: Everton, Tottenham Hotspur

==== Biggest & smallest ====
Biggest home wins: 4–0 vs. Charlton Athletic, 28 August 2004
Biggest home defeat: 0–2 vs. Manchester United, 13 February 2005
Biggest away win: 1–3 vs. Portsmouth, 20 November 2004
Biggest away defeat: 2–0 vs. West Bromwich Albion, 22 January 2005

Biggest home attendance: 47,221 vs. Middlesbrough, 15 May 2005
Smallest home attendance: 42,453 vs. Birmingham City, 20 April 2005
Biggest away attendance: 67,863 vs. Manchester United, 7 November 2004
Smallest away attendance: 20,101 vs. Portsmouth, 20 November 2004

==== Results by round ====
Round	1	2	3	4	5	6	7	8	9	10	11	12	13	14	15	16	17	18	19	20	21	22	23	24	25	26	27	28	29	30	31	32	33	34	35	36	37	38
Ground	H	A	A	H	H	A	H	A	H	A	H	A	H	A	H	A	H	A	A	H	H	A	H	A	H	A	H	A	H	A	A	H	A	H	A	H	A	H
Result	D	L	L	W	L	W	L	D	W	L	D	D	D	W	W	L	L	W	L	D	W	D	W	L	D	D	L	W	L	L	D	W	D	W	D	W	W	D
Position	10	15	19	9	13	10	14	12	10	13	12	13	12	11	9	11	13	10	11	12	10	9	9	9	10	10	11	10	12	12	12	11	11	11	10	8	8	8

A = Away; H = Home; W = Win; D = Draw; L = Loss

|text_H=Home|text_A=Away |color_W=green2|text_W=Win |color_D=yellow2|text_D=Draw |color_L=red2|text_L=Loss

|updated=complete |source=2004–05 Premier League results |date=November 2010 }}

==== Individual match reports ====
14 August 2004	Manchester City	1–1	Fulham	City of Manchester Stadium; Manchester
15:00	Fowler 28'	Guardian report	56' John	Attendance: 44,026; Referee: Matt Messias

21 August 2004	Liverpool	2–1	Manchester City	Anfield; Liverpool
15:00	Baroš 48'; Gerrard 75'	Guardian report	45' Anelka; (yellow card) (red card) 85' Dunne	Attendance: 42,831; Referee: Graham Poll

24 August 2004	Birmingham City	1–0	Manchester City	St Andrews; Birmingham
19:45	Heskey 8'	Guardian report		Attendance: 28,551; Referee: Phil Dowd

28 August 2004	Manchester City	4–0	Charlton Athletic	City of Manchester Stadium; Manchester
15:00	Anelka 13', 60'; Sinclair 34'; S. Wright-Phillips 78'	Guardian report		Attendance: 43,593; Referee: Mark Halsey

11 September 2004	Manchester City	0–1	Everton	City of Manchester Stadium; Manchester
15:00		Guardian report	60' (yellow card) (red card) 61' Cahill	Attendance: 47,006; Referee: Steve Bennett

18 September 2004	Crystal Palace	1–2	Manchester City	Selhurst Park; London
15:00	Johnson 77' (pen.)	Guardian report	55', 64' (pen.) Anelka	Attendance: 25,768; Referee: Martin Atkinson

25 September 2004	Manchester City	0–1	Arsenal	City of Manchester Stadium; Manchester
15:00		Guardian report	14' Cole	Attendance: 47,015; Referee: Neale Barry

2 October 2004	Southampton	0–0	Manchester City	St Mary's Stadium; Southampton
12:45		Guardian report		Attendance: 28,605; Referee: Uriah Rennie

16 October 2004	Manchester City	1–0	Chelsea	City of Manchester Stadium; Manchester
17:15	Anelka 11' (pen.)	Guardian report		Attendance: 45,047; Referee: Howard Webb

24 October 2004	Newcastle United	4–3	Manchester City	St James' Park; Newcastle
15:00	Robert 49'; Shearer 58' (pen.); Elliott 69'; Bellamy 89'	Guardian report	64', 77' S. Wright-Phillips; 67' (pen.) Fowler	Attendance: 52,316; Referee: Steve Dunn

1 November 2004	Manchester City	1–1	Norwich City	City of Manchester Stadium; Manchester
20:00	Flood 11'	Guardian report	46' Francis	Attendance: 42,803; Referee: Steve Bennett

7 November 2004	Manchester United	0–0	Manchester City	Old Trafford; Manchester
16:05	Smith (yellow card) (red card) 89'	Guardian report		Attendance: 67,863; Referee: Graham Poll

13 November 2004	Manchester City	1–1	Blackburn Rovers	City of Manchester Stadium; Manchester
15:00	Sibierski 45'; Mills (red card) 77'	Guardian report	78' (pen.) Dickov	Attendance: 45,504; Referee: Mark Clattenburg

20 November 2004	Portsmouth	1–3	Manchester City	Fratton Park; Portsmouth
17:15	O'Neil 8'	Guardian report	6' S. Wright-Phillips; 79' Sibierski; 87' Bosvelt	Attendance: 20,101; Referee: Matt Messias

27 November 2004	Manchester City	2–0	Aston Villa	City of Manchester Stadium; Manchester
17:15	Macken 29'; S. Wright-Phillips 38'	Guardian report	(red card) 90' Hendrie	Attendance: 44,530; Referee: Mike Riley

6 December 2004	Middlesbrough	3–2	Manchester City	Riverside Stadium; Middlesbrough
20:00	Viduka 9', 54'; Hasselbaink 65'	Guardian report	39' Fowler; 80' B. Wright-Phillips	Attendance: 29,787; Referee: Graham Poll

11 December 2004	Manchester City	0–1	Tottenham Hotspur	City of Manchester Stadium; Manchester
15:00		Guardian report	57' Kanouté	Attendance: 45,805; Referee: Dermot Gallagher

18 December 2004	Bolton Wanderers	0–1	Manchester City	Reebok Stadium; Bolton
15:00		Guardian report	52' Barton	Attendance: 27,274; Referee: Uriah Rennie

26 December 2004	Everton	2–1	Manchester City	Goodison Park; Liverpool
15:00	Cahill 22'; Bent 63'	Guardian report	42' Fowler; (red card) 83' Negouai	Attendance: 40,530; Referee: Phil Dowd

28 December 2004	Manchester City	1–1	West Bromwich Albion	City of Manchester Stadium; Manchester
15:00	Anelka 32'	Guardian report	85' (o.g.) Dunne; (red card) 17' Gaardsoe	Attendance: 47,177; Referee: Andy D'Urso

1 January 2005	Manchester City	2–1	Southampton	City of Manchester Stadium; Manchester
15:00	Bosvelt 19'; S. Wright-Phillips 40'	Guardian report	90' (pen.) Phillips	Attendance: 42,895; Referee: Chris Foy

4 January 2005	Arsenal	1–1	Manchester City	Highbury; London
19:45	Ljungberg 75'	Guardian report	31' S. Wright-Phillips	Attendance: 38,086; Referee: Rob Styles

15 January 2005	Manchester City	3–1	Crystal Palace	City of Manchester Stadium; Manchester
15:00	S. Wright-Phillips 12', 90'; Fowler 15'	Guardian report	32' Powell	Attendance: 44,010; Referee: Andre Marriner

22 January 2005	West Bromwich Albion	2–0	Manchester City	The Hawthorns; West Bromwich
17:15	Campbell 5'; Wallwork 81'	Guardian report		Attendance: 25,348; Referee: Graham Poll

2 February 2005	Manchester City	1–1	Newcastle United	City of Manchester Stadium; Manchester
19:45	Fowler 49' (pen.)	Guardian report	9' Shearer	Attendance: 45,752; Referee: Andy D'Urso

6 February 2005	Chelsea	0–0	Manchester City	Stamford Bridge; London
16:05		Guardian report		Attendance: 42,093; Referee: Howard Webb

13 February 2005	Manchester City	0–2	Manchester United	City of Manchester Stadium; Manchester
13:00		Guardian report	68' Rooney; 75' (o.g.) Dunne	Attendance: 47,111; Referee: Steve Bennett

28 February 2005	Norwich City	2–3	Manchester City	Carrow Road; Norwich
20:00	Ashton 12'; McKenzie 16'; Jonson (yellow card) (red card) 66'	Guardian report	25' Sibierski; 37', 90' Fowler	Attendance: 24,302; Referee: Rob Styles

7 March 2005	Manchester City	0–1	Bolton Wanderers	City of Manchester Stadium; Manchester
20:00		Guardian report	45' Diouf	Attendance: 43,050; Referee: Alan Wiley

19 March 2005	Tottenham Hotspur	2–1	Manchester City	White Hart Lane; London
15:00	Defoe 16'; Keane 84'	Guardian report	44' Reyna	Attendance: 35,681; Referee: Barry Knight

2 April 2005	Charlton Athletic	2–2	Manchester City	The Valley; London
12:45	Bartlett 10'; Perry 90'	Guardian report	4' (o.g.) Hreiðarsson; 38' Fowler	Attendance: 26,436; Referee: Rob Styles

9 April 2005	Manchester City	1–0	Liverpool	City of Manchester Stadium; Manchester
15:00	Musampa 90'	Guardian report		Attendance: 47,203; Referee: Mike Riley

16 April 2005	Fulham	1–1	Manchester City	Craven Cottage; London
15:00	Boa Morte 76'	Guardian report	20' Reyna	Attendance: 21,796; Referee: Neale Barry

20 April 2005	Manchester City	3–0	Birmingham City	City of Manchester Stadium; Manchester
19:45	Taylor 55' (o.g.); Dunne 80'; Sibierski 86' (pen.)	Guardian report		Attendance: 42,453; Referee: Martin Atkinson

23 April 2005	Blackburn Rovers	0–0	Manchester City	Ewood Park; Blackburn
15:00		Guardian report		Attendance: 24,646; Referee: Chris Foy

30 April 2005	Manchester City	2–0	Portsmouth	City of Manchester Stadium; Manchester
15:00	Distin 4'; Fowler 16'	Guardian report		Attendance: 46,454; Referee: Andre Marriner

7 May 2005	Aston Villa	1–2	Manchester City	Villa Park; Birmingham
15:00	Ángel 62'	Guardian report	5' S. Wright-Phillips; 12' Musampa	Attendance: 39,645; Referee: Richard Beeby

15 May 2005	Manchester City	1–1	Middlesbrough	City of Manchester Stadium; Manchester
15:00	Musampa 46'	Guardian report	23' Hasselbaink	Attendance: 47,221; Referee: Rob Styles

=== League Cup ===
21 September 2004 Second round	Manchester City	7–1	Barnsley	City of Manchester Stadium; Manchester
19:45	Barton 21'; Macken 28', 44'; Flood 33'; S. Wright-Phillips 36'; Sibierski 56', 84'	Guardian report	47' Conlon	Attendance: 19,578; Referee: Paul Robinson

27 October 2004 Third round	Manchester City	1–2	Arsenal	City of Manchester Stadium; Manchester
19:45	Fowler 90'	Guardian report	78' Van Persie; 90' Karbassiyoon	Attendance: 21,708; Referee: Peter Walton

=== FA Cup ===
8 January 2005 Third round	Oldham Athletic	1–0	Manchester City	Boundary Park; Oldham
15:00	Vernon 14'	Guardian report		Attendance: 13,171; Referee: Mike Dean

== Playing statistics ==
No.	Pos.	Player	League		FA Cup		League Cup		Totals		Discipline	
No.	Pos.	Player	Apps.	Goals	Apps.	Goals	Apps.	Goals	Apps.	Goals	Yellow card	Red card
1	GK	(England) David James	38(0)		1(0)				39(0)			
2	DF	(Guadeloupe) David Sommeil	1(0)				1(1)		2(1)			
3	DF	(Wales) Ben Thatcher	18(1)		1(0)		2(0)		21(1)		2	
5	DF	(France) Sylvain Distin	38(0)	1	1(0)		2(0)		41(0)	1	3	
6	MF	(United States) Claudio Reyna	17(1)	2					17(1)	2		
8	FW	(England) Robbie Fowler	32(4)	10			1(0)	1	33(4)	11	3	
10	MF	(France) Antoine Sibierski	35(1)	4	1(0)		2(0)	2	38(1)	6	3	
11	FW	(England) Jon Macken	23(7)	1	1(0)		1(0)	2	25(7)	3		
12	GK	(England) Nicky Weaver	1(1)						1(1)			
14	MF	(Netherlands) Kiki Musampa	14(0)	3					14(0)	3		
16	DF	(England) Nedum Onuoha	17(6)				1(0)		18(6)			
17	DF	(China) Sun Jihai	6(2)				1(0)		7(2)		1	
18	DF	(England) Danny Mills	32(3)		1(0)		2(0)		35(3)		5	– / 1
20	MF	(England) Steve McManaman	13(7)		1(1)				14(8)		1	
21	GK	(Netherlands) Ronald Waterreus					2(0)		2(0)			
22	DF	(Republic of Ireland) Richard Dunne	35(0)	2	1(0)				36(0)	2	7	1 / –
24	MF	(England) Joey Barton	32(3)	1	1(0)		1(0)	1	34(3)	2	9	
26	MF	(Netherlands) Paul Bosvelt	28(0)	2	1(0)		1(0)		30(0)	2	6	
28	MF	(England) Trevor Sinclair	4(2)	1			1(0)		5(2)	1		
29	MF	(England) Shaun Wright-Phillips	33(1)	10	1(0)		2(0)	1	36(1)	11		
30	MF	(Martinique) Christian Negouai	1(1)				1(1)		2(2)			– / 1
31	MF	(England) Jonathan D'Laryea					1(0)		1(0)			
39	Sold	(France) Nicolas Anelka	19(1)	7					19(1)	7		
40	MF	(England) Lee Croft	7(7)						7(7)			
41	DF	(England) Stephen Jordan	19(0)				1(1)		20(1)		5	
42	FW	(England) Bradley Wright-Phillips	14 (14)	1	1(0)		1(1)		16 (15)	1		
44	MF	(Republic of Ireland) Willo Flood	9(5)	1	1(1)		2(0)	1	12(6)	2	1	
TOTALS				45				8		53	46	1 / 2

Information current as of 15 May 2005 (end of season)

Last updated: 26 February 2011.
Source: (for appearances, goals and discipline stats.) All match Reports in Competitive games section above

=== Goalscorers ===
==== All competitions ====
Scorer	Goals
(England) Robbie Fowler	11
(England) Shaun Wright-Phillips	11
(France) Nicolas Anelka	7
(France) Antoine Sibierski	6
(England) Jon Macken	3
(Netherlands) Kiki Musampa	3
(England) Joey Barton	2
(Netherlands) Paul Bosvelt	2
(Republic of Ireland) Willo Flood	2
(United States) Claudio Reyna	2
(France) Sylvain Distin	1
(Republic of Ireland) Richard Dunne	1
(England) Trevor Sinclair	1
(England) Bradley Wright-Phillips	1

==== Premier League ====
Scorer	Goals
(England) Robbie Fowler	10
(England) Shaun Wright-Phillips	10
(France) Nicolas Anelka	7
(France) Antoine Sibierski	4
(Netherlands) Kiki Musampa	3
(Netherlands) Paul Bosvelt	2
(United States) Claudio Reyna	2
(England) Joey Barton	1
(France) Sylvain Distin	1
(Republic of Ireland) Richard Dunne	1
(Republic of Ireland) Willo Flood	1
(England) Jon Macken	1
(England) Trevor Sinclair	1
(England) Bradley Wright-Phillips	1

==== League Cup and FA Cup ====
Scorer	Goals
(England) Jon Macken	2
(France) Antoine Sibierski	2
(England) Joey Barton	1
(Republic of Ireland) Willo Flood	1
(England) Robbie Fowler	1
(England) Shaun Wright-Phillips	1

Information current as of 15 May 2005 (end of season)

== Transfers and loans ==
=== Transfers in ===
Date	Pos.	Player	From club	Transfer fee
21 June 2004	DF	(Wales) Ben Thatcher	(England) Leicester City	Free
21 June 2004	DF	(Belgium) Geert De Vlieger	(Netherlands) Willem II	Free
14 July 2004	DF	(England) Danny Mills	(England) Leeds United	Free
26 Aug. 2004	GK	(Netherlands) Ronald Waterreus	(Netherlands) PSV Eindhoven	Free

=== Transfers out ===
Exit date	Pos.	Player	To club	Transfer fee
May 2004	GK	(Iceland) Árni Gautur Arason	(Norway) Vålerenga	Released
26 May 04	DF	(Netherlands) Gerard Wiekens	(Netherlands) Veendam	Released
1 June 04	FW	(Republic of Ireland) Stephen Elliott	(England) Sunderland	Tribunal: £375,000+
16 June 04	DF	(Germany) Michael Tarnat	(Germany) Hannover 96	Free
25 June 04	DF	(Australia) Danny Tiatto	(England) Leicester City	Free
1 July 04	MF	(Republic of Ireland) Glenn Whelan	(England) Sheffield Wed.	Free
5 July 04	FW	(Mexico) Vicente Matías Vuoso	(Mexico) Santos Laguna	Undisclosed
Aug. 2004	FW	(England) Craig Davies	(England) Oxford United	
26 Aug. 04	FW	(Costa Rica) Paulo Wanchope	(Spain) Málaga	£500,000
31 Jan. 05	FW	(France) Nicolas Anelka	(Turkey) Fenerbahçe	£7 million
31 Jan. 05	GK	(Netherlands) Ronald Waterreus	(Scotland) Rangers	Free
3 Mar. 05	DF	(Republic of Ireland) Paddy McCarthy	(England) Leicester City	£100,000
20 May 05	MF	(England) Steve McManaman	Retired	

=== Loans in ===
Date from	Date to	Pos.	Player	To club
27 Jan. 2005	5 June 2005	MF	(Netherlands) Kiki Musampa	(Spain) Atlético Madrid

=== Loans out ===
Date from	Date to	Pos.	Player	To club
30 Sep. 2004	29 Oct. 2004	DF	(Denmark) Mikkel Bischoff	(England) Wolves
10 Nov. 2004	9 Feb. 2005	MF	(England) Lee Croft	(England) Oldham Athletic
31 Dec. 2004	30 Jan. 2005	GK	(Denmark) Kevin Stuhr-Ellegaard	(England) Blackpool
27 Jan. 2005	15 Feb. 2005	MF	(France) Christian Negouai	(England) Coventry City
24 Mar. 2005	31 May 2005	DF	(Denmark) Mikkel Bischoff	(England) Wolves
11 Feb. 2005	16 Mar. 2005	FW	(Republic of Ireland) Karl Bermingham	(England) Lincoln City
