= 2002–03 Manchester City F.C. season =

English football club season

Manchester City
2002–03 season
- Owner: Publicly traded company
- Chairman: David Bernstein (until 5 March 2003); John Wardle
- Manager: Kevin Keegan
- Stadium: Maine Road
- Premier League: 9th
- FA Cup: Third round
- League Cup: Third round
- Top goalscorer: League: Nicolas Anelka (14 goals); All: Nicolas Anelka (14 goals)
- Highest home attendance: 35,141 (v. Liverpool, 28 September 2002)
- Lowest home attendance: 21,820 (v. Crewe Alexandra, 1 October 2002)
- Average home league attendance: 34,564
Home colours	Away colours	Third colours

Results summary - all competitions
	Wins	Draws	Losses	Win %
Home	10	2	9	47.6%
Away	6	4	10	30.0%
Both	16	6	19	39.0%

Results summary - Premier League
	Wins	Draws	Losses	Win %
Home	9	2	8	47.4%
Away	6	4	9	31.6%
Both	15	6	17	39.5%

The 2002–03 season was Manchester City Football Club's first season back playing in the Premier League again after having been relegated from it at the end of the 2000–01 season. This was the club's sixth season playing in the Premier League since its initial formation as the top tier of English football ten years earlier, with Manchester City as one of its original 22 founding member clubs. Overall, this was Manchester City's 111th season playing in any division of English football, most of which have been spent in the top flight. It was also City's last season at Maine Road, their home since 1923. They moved to the City of Manchester (now Etihad) Stadium in the summer of 2003.

== Season review ==
This season was the team's first one playing in the Premier League under the stewardship of Kevin Keegan who, having taken over the helm as manager from Joe Royle after the club had been relegated to the Football League First Division fifteen months earlier, had led the club to an immediate promotion back to the top flight. In fact, the previous season had seen Manchester City promoted in style, with the team breaking many prior club records as it became the new First Division champions. This successful campaign allowed Keegan to delve into the transfer market in the summer and he brought in a number of high-profile players - such as striker Nicolas Anelka, defender Sylvain Distin and goalkeeper Peter Schmeichel - in an effort to ensure that the team was strong enough to remain in the Premier League now that it was back there again.

By spending the £13m transfer fee required to bring Anelka to Manchester City from Paris Saint-Germain the club broke its previous transfer record. Sylvain Distin also transferred over to Manchester City from PSG for £5m, while Peter Schmeichel joined the club on a free transfer from Aston Villa. Some of the other players Keegan brought in during the newly introduced summer transfer window were Marc-Vivien Foé, who joined the club on a season-long loan from Lyon, Vicente Matías Vuoso (from Independiente) and Mikkel Bischoff. Additionally, Robbie Fowler, David Sommeil and Djamel Belmadi were also signed by Keegan a few months later during the 2003 January transfer window.

The new year would also see the man that had been the main impetus behind the hiring of Kevin Keegan, chairman David Bernstein, fall out with his new hire and leave the club following a boardroom dispute over finances and managerial structure that followed closely on the back of the previous week's resignation of the club's managing director. The initial cause of this dispute had occurred back in January concerning the protracted transfer saga of Robbie Fowler (which Bernstein had originally brokered). He was succeeded as club chairman by former deputy chairman John Wardle.

This season's campaign would finally see Manchester City win its first Manchester Derby in over 13 years, allowing Peter Schmeichel to establish an exceptional record where he has never been on the losing side in a derby game. During his nine years playing with Manchester United the Reds were unbeaten against Manchester City, while in his single final season playing with the Blues, City won the derby game played at Maine Road and drew the one played at Old Trafford. This was also to be Manchester City's last season playing at its historic Maine Road ground before moving to its current home at City of Manchester Stadium. Consequently, the last game of the season was also the last game ever played at the club's old ground, and Marc-Vivien Foé would have the distinction of being recorded in the soccer annals as the player who scored the last ever goal for Manchester City at Maine Road.

== Team kit ==
The team kit was produced by Le Coq Sportif and the shirt sponsorship was provided by the financial and legal services group First Advice.

Home	Away	Third

== First-team squad ==
Squad at end of season

Note: Flags indicate national team as defined under FIFA eligibility rules; some limited exceptions apply. Players may hold more than one non-FIFA nationality.

No.	Pos.	Nation	Player
1	GK	DEN	Peter Schmeichel
2	DF	FRA	David Sommeil
3	DF	DEN	Niclas Jensen
4	DF	NED	Gerard Wiekens
5	DF	FRA	Sylvain Distin
6	MF	NIR	Kevin Horlock
7	FW	ENG	Darren Huckerby
8	MF	ALG	Ali Benarbia
9	FW	CRC	Paulo Wanchope
10	FW	BER	Shaun Goater
11	FW	ENG	Jon Macken
12	GK	ENG	Nicky Weaver
13	MF	FRA	Christian Negouai
14	DF	ISR	Eyal Berkovic
15	DF	NOR	Alf-Inge Haaland
16	DF	SCO	Paul Ritchie
17	DF	CHN	Sun Jihai
19	MF	AUS	Danny Tiatto
20	GK	ENG	Carlo Nash

No.	Pos.	Nation	Player
21	FW	ARG	Vicente Matías Vuoso
22	DF	IRL	Richard Dunne
23	MF	CMR	Marc-Vivien Foé (on loan from Lyon)
24	DF	ENG	Steve Howey
25	DF	CMR	Lucien Mettomo
27	DF	DEN	Mikkel Bischoff
28	DF	NED	Tyrone Loran
29	MF	ENG	Shaun Wright-Phillips
30	DF	IRL	Paddy McCarthy
31	MF	ALG	Djamel Belmadi (on loan from Marseille)
32	GK	DEN	Kevin Stuhr-Ellegaard
33	FW	ENG	Robbie Fowler
34	DF	ENG	Stephen Jordan
35	GK	IRL	Brian Murphy
36	MF	IRL	Glenn Whelan
39	FW	FRA	Nicolas Anelka
40	MF	ENG	Chris Shuker
41	MF	ENG	Joey Barton

=== Left club during season ===
Note: Flags indicate national team as defined under FIFA eligibility rules; some limited exceptions apply. Players may hold more than one non-FIFA nationality.

No.	Pos.	Nation	Player
18	MF	NIR	Jeff Whitley (released)
31	DF	FRA	Laurent Charvet (to Sochaux)
33	FW	NZL	Chris Killen (to Oldham Athletic)
33	GK	ENG	Tim Flowers (on loan from Leicester City)

No.	Pos.	Nation	Player
37	MF	CAN	Terry Dunfield (to Bury)
38	MF	WAL	Rhys Day (to Mansfield Town)
44	MF	ALG	Karim Kerkar (released)

== Historical league performance ==
Prior to this season, the history of Manchester City's performance in the English football league hierarchy since the creation of the Premier League in 1992 is summarised by the following timeline chart–which commences with the last season (1991–92) of the old Football League First Division (from which the Premier League was formed).

== Games ==
=== Premier League ===
==== Position in final standings ====
Pos	Team	Pld	W	D	L	GF	GA	GD	Pts	Qualification or relegation
7	Everton	38	17	8	13	48	49	−1	59	
8	Southampton	38	13	13	12	43	46	−3	52	Qualification for the UEFA Cup first round (Note: Since Arsenal qualified for the Champions League, their place in the UEFA Cup as FA Cup winners went to Southampton, who were the FA Cup runners-up.)
9	Manchester City	38	15	6	17	47	54	−7	51	Qualification for the UEFA Cup qualifying round (Note: Manchester City qualified as the highest-ranked team not already qualified for European competitions of Premiership Fair Play League by The Football Association, the top association among UEFA Fair Play ranking winners.)
10	Tottenham Hotspur	38	14	8	16	51	62	−11	50	
11	Middlesbrough	38	13	10	15	48	44	+4	49	

Source: Premier League
Rules for classification: 1) points; 2) goal difference; 3) number of goals scored.

==== Results summary ====
Overall								Home						Away					
Pld	W	D	L	GF	GA	GD	Pts	W	D	L	GF	GA	GD	W	D	L	GF	GA	GD
38	15	6	17	47	54	−7	51	9	2	8	28	26	+2	6	4	9	19	28	−9

Last updated: 11 May 2003 (end of season).
Source: Premier League results 2002–03

==== Points breakdown ====
Points at home: 29
Points away from home: 22

Points against "Big Four" teams: 7
Points against promoted teams: 9

6 points: Birmingham City, Fulham, Sunderland
4 points: Everton, Manchester United
3 points: Aston Villa, Bolton Wanderers, Leeds United, Liverpool,

Newcastle United, Tottenham Hotspur, West Bromwich Albion

1 point: Blackburn Rovers, Charlton Athletic, Middlesbrough, West Ham United
0 points: Arsenal, Chelsea, Southampton

==== Biggest & smallest ====
Biggest home win: 4–1 vs. Fulham, 29 January 2003
Biggest home defeat: 1–5 vs. Arsenal, 22 February 2003
Biggest away win: 0–3 vs. Sunderland, 9 December 2002
Biggest away defeat: 5–0 vs. Chelsea, 22 March 2003

Biggest home attendance: 35,141 vs. Liverpool, 28 September 2002
Smallest home attendance: 33,260 vs. Fulham, 29 January 2003
Biggest away attendance: 67,646 vs. Manchester United, 9 February 2003
Smallest away attendance: 17,937 vs. Fulham, 28 September 2002

==== Results by round ====
Round	1	2	3	4	5	6	7	8	9	10	11	12	13	14	15	16	17	18	19	20	21	22	23	24	25	26	27	28	29	30	31	32	33	34	35	36	37	38
Ground	A	H	A	H	A	H	A	H	A	H	A	A	H	H	A	H	A	A	H	H	A	A	H	A	H	H	A	H	A	H	A	A	H	A	H	A	A	H
Result	L	W	L	W	L	D	D	L	L	L	W	W	W	L	L	W	W	D	L	W	W	D	W	L	W	L	D	L	L	W	L	L	D	W	W	L	W	L

Source: Premier League results 2002–03
A = Away; H = Home; W = Win; D = Draw; L = Loss

==== Individual match reports ====
17 August 2002	Leeds United	3–0	Manchester City	Elland Road; Leeds
15:00	Barmby 15'; Viduka 45'; Keane 80'	Guardian report		Attendance: 40,195

24 August 2002	Manchester City	1–0	Newcastle United	Maine Road; Manchester
12:15	Huckerby 36'	Guardian report		Attendance: 34,776

28 August 2002	Aston Villa	1–0	Manchester City	Villa Park; Birmingham
19:45	Vassell 64'	Guardian report		Attendance: 33,494

31 August 2002	Manchester City	3–1	Everton	Maine Road; Manchester
15:00	Radzinski 14' (o.g.); Anelka 16' 85'	Guardian report	29' (pen.) Unsworth	Attendance: 34,835

10 September 2002	Arsenal	2–1	Manchester City	Highbury; London
15:00	Wiltord 26'; Henry 42'	Guardian report	29' Anelka	Attendance: 37,878

15 September 2002	Manchester City	2–2	Blackburn Rovers	Maine Road; Manchester
15:00	Anelka 80'; Goater 90'; Tiatto (red card) 67'	Guardian report	26' Thompson; 54' Cole	Attendance: 34,130

21 September 2002	West Ham United	0–0	Manchester City	Boleyn Ground; London
15:00		Guardian report		Attendance: 35,550

28 September 2002	Manchester City	0–3	Liverpool	Maine Road; Manchester
15:00		Guardian report	4' 64' 89' Owen	Attendance: 35,141

5 October 2002	Southampton	2–0	Manchester City	St Mary's Stadium; Southampton
15:00	Ormerod 2' 43'	Guardian report		Attendance: 31,009

19 October 2002	Manchester City	0–3	Chelsea	Maine Road; Manchester
15:00		Guardian report	69' 84' Zola; 85' Hasselbaink	Attendance: 34,953

26 October 2002	Birmingham City	0–2	Manchester City	St Andrew's; Birmingham
15:00		Guardian report	24' Sun; 87' Anelka	Attendance: 29,316

2 November 2002	West Bromwich Albion	1–2	Manchester City	The Hawthorns; West Bromwich
15:00	Clement 62'	Guardian report	51' Anelka; 71' Goater	Attendance: 27,044

9 November 2002	Manchester City	3–1	Manchester United	Maine Road; Manchester
12:15	Anelka 5'; Goater 26' 51'	Guardian report MCFC video	8' Solskjær	Attendance: 34,649

16 November 2002	Manchester City	0–1	Charlton Athletic	Maine Road; Manchester
15:00		Guardian report	79' Bartlett	Attendance: 33,455

23 November 2002	Middlesbrough	3–1	Manchester City	Riverside Stadium; Middlesbrough
15:00	Ehiogu 53'; Bokšić 62'; Geremi 84'	Guardian report	68' Anelka; (yellow card) 72' (yellow-red card) Wright-Phillips	Attendance: 31,510

30 November 2002	Manchester City	2–0	Bolton Wanderers	Maine Road; Manchester
15:00	Howey 25'; Berkovic 56'	Guardian report		Attendance: 34,860

9 December 2002	Sunderland	0–3	Manchester City	Stadium of Light; Sunderland
19:45		Guardian report	44' Foé; 62' Sun; 87' Goater	Attendance: 36,511

14 December 2002	Charlton Athletic	2–2	Manchester City	The Valley; London
15:00	Euell 50' (pen.); Jensen 63'	Guardian report	74' 86' Foé	Attendance: 26,434

23 December 2002	Manchester City	2–3	Tottenham Hotspur	Maine Road; Manchester
19:45	Howey 29'; Benarbia 90'	Guardian report	38' Perry; 48' Davies; 83' Poyet; (yellow card) 86' (yellow-red card) Ziege	Attendance: 34,563

26 December 2002	Manchester City	3–1	Aston Villa	Maine Road; Manchester
15:00	Foé 15' 80'; Benarbia 78'	Guardian report	41' Dublin	Attendance: 33,991

28 December 2002	Fulham	0–1	Manchester City	Loftus Road; London
15:00		Guardian report	15' Anelka	Attendance: 17,937

1 January 2003	Everton	2–2	Manchester City	Goodison Park; Liverpool
15:00	Watson 6'; Radzinski 90'	Guardian report	33' Anelka; 82' Foé	Attendance: 40,163

11 January 2003	Manchester City	2–1	Leeds United	Maine Road; Manchester
15:00	Goater 29'; Jensen 50'	Guardian report	90' Kewell	Attendance: 34,884

18 January 2003	Newcastle United	2–0	Manchester City	St James' Park; Newcastle
15:00	Shearer 1'; Bellamy 64'	Guardian report		Attendance: 52,152; Referee: Graham Poll

29 January 2003	Manchester City	4–1	Fulham	Maine Road; Manchester
15:00	Anelka 21'; Benarbia 47'; Foé 61'; Wright-Phillips 70'	Guardian report	2' Malbranque	Attendance: 33,260; Referee: Steve Bennett

1 February 2003	Manchester City	1–2	West Bromwich Albion	Maine Road; Manchester
15:00	Gilchrist 22' (o.g.)	Guardian report	18' Clement; 79' Gregan; (red card) 81' Roberts	Attendance: 34,765; Referee: Neale Barry

9 February 2003	Manchester United	1–1	Manchester City	Old Trafford; Manchester
12:30	van Nistelrooy 18'	Guardian report	86' Goater	Attendance: 67,646; Referee: Alan Wiley

22 February 2003	Manchester City	1–5	Arsenal	Maine Road; Manchester
15:00	Anelka 87'	Guardian report	4' Bergkamp; 12' Pires; 15' Henry; 19' Campbell; 53' Vieira	Attendance: 34,960; Referee: Paul Durkin

1 March 2003	Blackburn Rovers	1–0	Manchester City	Ewood Park; Blackburn
15:00	Dunn 13'	Guardian report		Attendance: 28,647; Referee: Steve Dunn

16 March 2003	Manchester City	1–0	Birmingham City	Maine Road; Manchester
14:00	Fowler 72'; Jensen (yellow card) (red card) 79'	Guardian report		Attendance: 34,596; Referee: Matt Messias

22 March 2003	Chelsea	5–0	Manchester City	Stamford Bridge; London
15:00	Hasselbaink 37'; Terry 43'; Stanić 58'; Lampard 69'; Gallas 79'	Guardian report	(yellow card) 90' (yellow-red card) Sun	Attendance: 41,105; Referee: Phil Dowd

5 April 2003	Bolton Wanderers	2–0	Manchester City	Reebok Stadium; Bolton
12:00	Pedersen 32'; Iván Campo 52'	Guardian report		Attendance: 26,949; Referee: Chris Wilkes

12 April 2003	Manchester City	0–0	Middlesbrough	Maine Road; Manchester
15:00		Guardian report		Attendance: 34,793; Referee: Andy D'Urso

18 April 2003	Tottenham Hotspur	0–2	Manchester City	White Hart Lane; London
15:00		Guardian report	3' Sommeil; 21' Barton	Attendance: 36,075; Referee: Mike Riley

21 April 2003	Manchester City	3–0	Sunderland	Maine Road; Manchester
15:00	Foé 36' 80'; Fowler 38'	Guardian report MCFC video		Attendance: 34,357; Referee: Graham Barber

27 April 2003	Manchester City	0–1	West Ham United	Maine Road; Manchester
14:00		Guardian report	81' Kanoute	Attendance: 34,815; Referee: Rob Styles

3 May 2003	Liverpool	1–2	Manchester City	Anfield; Liverpool
15:00	Baroš 59'	Guardian report MCFC video	Anelka 74' (pen.) 90+3'	Attendance: 44,220; Referee: Neale Barry

11 May 2003	Manchester City	0–1	Southampton	Maine Road; Manchester
15:00		Guardian report	34' M. Svensson	Attendance: 34,957; Referee: Mike Dean

=== League Cup ===
==== Second round ====
1 October 2002	Manchester City	3–2	Crewe Alexandra	Maine Road; Manchester
19:45	Berkovic 69'; Walker 84' (o.g.); Huckerby 87'	Guardian report	1' Jack; 86' Hulse	Attendance: 21,820; Referee: Roy Pearson

==== Third round ====
5 November 2002	Wigan Athletic	1–0	Manchester City	JJB Stadium; Wigan
20:00	Roberts 35'	Guardian report		Attendance: 15,007; Referee: Mike Dean

=== FA Cup ===
==== Third round ====
5 January 2003	Manchester City	0–1	Liverpool	Maine Road; Manchester
13:00		Guardian report	47' (pen.) Murphy	Attendance: 28,586; Referee: Uriah Rennie

== Statistics ==
=== Appearances and goals ===
No.	Pos	Nat	Player	Total		Premier League		FA Cup		League Cup	
No.	Pos	Nat	Player	Apps	Goals	Apps	Goals	Apps	Goals	Apps	Goals
Goalkeepers
1	GK	(Denmark) DEN	Peter Schmeichel	31	0	29	0	1	0	1	0
20	GK	(England) ENG	Carlo Nash	10	0	9	0	0	0	1	0
Defenders
2	DF	(France) FRA	David Sommeil	14	1	14	1	0	0	0	0
3	DF	(Denmark) DEN	Niclas Jensen	36	1	32+1	1	1	0	2	0
4	DF	(Netherlands) NED	Gerard Wiekens	8	0	5+1	0	1	0	0+1	0
5	DF	(France) FRA	Sylvain Distin	36	0	34	0	1	0	1	0
17	DF	(China) CHN	Sun Jihai	31	2	25+3	2	1	0	2	0
22	DF	(Republic of Ireland) IRL	Richard Dunne	26	0	24+1	0	0	0	1	0
24	DF	(England) ENG	Steve Howey	26	2	24	2	0	0	2	0
25	DF	(Cameroon) CMR	Lucien Mettomo	6	0	3+1	0	1	0	1	0
27	DF	(Denmark) DEN	Mikkel Bischoff	1	0	1	0	0	0	0	0
34	DF	(England) ENG	Stephen Jordan	1	0	0+1	0	0	0	0	0
Midfielders
6	MF	(Northern Ireland) NIR	Kevin Horlock	33	0	22+8	0	1	0	1+1	0
8	MF	(Algeria) ALG	Ali Benarbia	36	3	21+12	3	1	0	2	0
14	MF	(Israel) ISR	Eyal Berkovic	29	2	27	1	0+1	0	1	1
19	MF	(Australia) AUS	Danny Tiatto	13	0	10+3	0	0	0	0	0
23	MF	(Cameroon) CMR	Marc-Vivien Foé	38	9	35	9	1	0	2	0
31	MF	(Algeria) ALG	Djamel Belmadi	8	0	2+6	0	0	0	0	0
40	MF	(England) ENG	Chris Shuker	3	0	1+2	0	0	0	0	0
41	MF	(England) ENG	Joey Barton	7	1	7	1	0	0	0	0
Forwards
7	FW	(England) ENG	Darren Huckerby	19	2	6+10	1	0+1	0	0+2	1
9	FW	(Costa Rica) CRC	Paulo Wanchope	0	0	0	0	0	0	0	0
10	FW	(Bermuda) BER	Shaun Goater	29	7	14+12	7	0+1	0	2	0
11	FW	(Republic of Ireland) IRL	Jon Macken	5	0	0+5	0	0	0	0	0
29	FW	(England) ENG	Shaun Wright-Phillips	34	1	23+8	1	1	0	1+1	0
33	FW	(England) ENG	Robbie Fowler	13	2	12+1	2	0	0	0	0
39	FW	(France) FRA	Nicolas Anelka	41	14	38	14	1	0	2	0

Last updated: 31 June 2003

== Goal scorers ==
=== All competitions ===
Scorer	Goals
(France) Nicolas Anelka	14
(Cameroon) Marc-Vivien Foé	9
(Bermuda) Shaun Goater	7
(Algeria) Ali Benarbia	3
(Israel) Eyal Berkovic	2
(England) Robbie Fowler	2
(England) Steve Howey	2
(England) Darren Huckerby	2
(China) Sun Jihai	2
(England) Joey Barton	1
(Denmark) Niclas Jensen	1
(Guadeloupe) David Sommeil	1
(England) Shaun Wright-Phillips	1

=== Premier League ===
Scorer	Goals
(France) Nicolas Anelka	14
(Cameroon) Marc-Vivien Foé	9
(Bermuda) Shaun Goater	7
(Algeria) Ali Benarbia	3
(England) Robbie Fowler	2
(England) Steve Howey	2
(China) Sun Jihai	2
(England) Joey Barton	1
(Israel) Eyal Berkovic	1
(England) Darren Huckerby	1
(Denmark) Niclas Jensen	1
(Guadeloupe) David Sommeil	1
(England) Shaun Wright-Phillips	1

=== League Cup and FA Cup ===
Scorer	Goals
(Israel) Eyal Berkovic	1
(England) Darren Huckerby	1

Information current as of 11 May 2003 (end of season)

== Transfers and loans ==
=== Transfers in ===
Date	Position	Player	From club	Transfer fee
20 May 2002	DF	(France) Sylvain Distin	(France) PSG	£4,000,000
24 May 2002	FW	(France) Nicolas Anelka	(France) PSG	£13,000,000
June 2002	GK	(Denmark) Peter Schmeichel	(England) Aston Villa	Free
August 2002	DF	(Netherlands Antilles) Tyrone Loran	(Netherlands) Volendam	£60,000

=== Transfers out ===
Exit date	Pos.	Player	To club	Transfer fee
17 October 2002	DF	(France) Laurent Charvet	(France) Sochaux	Released
7 March 2003	MF	(Northern Ireland) Jeff Whitley	(England) Sunderland	Released
15 May 2003	GK	(Denmark) Peter Schmeichel	Retired	

=== Loans in ===
Date from	Date to	Pos.	Player	From club
16 August 2002	16 November 2002	GK	(England) Tim Flowers	(England) Leicester City
3 January 2003	11 May 2003	MF	(Algeria) Djamel Belmadi	(France) Olympique de Marseille

=== Loans out ===
Date from	Date to	Pos.	Player	To club
20 September 2002	22 December 2002	DF	(Scotland) Paul Ritchie	(England) Portsmouth
23 November 2002	22 February 2003	DF	(Republic of Ireland) Paddy McCarthy	(England) Boston United
1 January 2003	31 May 2003	DF	(Netherlands Antilles) Tyrone Loran	(England) Tranmere Rovers
27 Mar. 2003	27 April 2003	DF	(Republic of Ireland) Paddy McCarthy	(England) Notts County
27 Mar. 2003	5 May 2003	DF	(Scotland) Paul Ritchie	(England) Derby County

== See also ==
- Manchester City F.C. seasons
