= Sylvain Distin =

French footballer (born 1977)

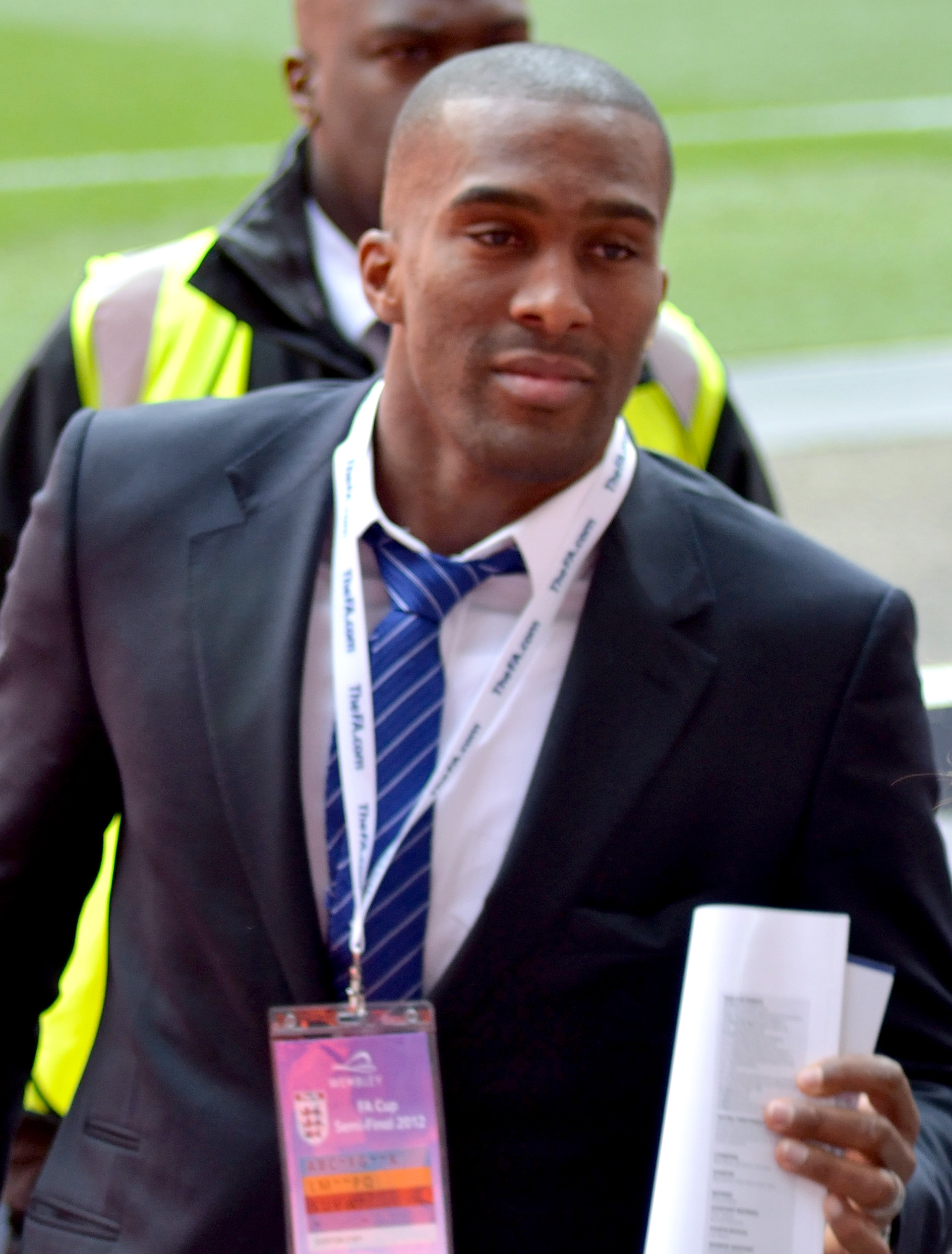
- Distin in 2012

Personal information
- Full name: Sylvain Distin
- Date of birth: 16 December 1977 (age 48)
- Place of birth: Bagnolet, France
- Height: 1.93 m (6 ft 4 in)
- Position: Defender

Senior career*
Years	Team	Apps	(Gls)
1997–1998	Joué-lès-Tours	32	(4)
1998–1999	Tours	26	(3)
1999–2000	Gueugnon	32	(1)
2000–2002	Paris Saint-Germain	28	(0)
2001–2002	→ Newcastle United (loan)	28	(0)
2002–2007	Manchester City	178	(5)
2007–2009	Portsmouth	77	(0)
2009–2015	Everton	174	(2)
2015–2016	Bournemouth	12	(0)
Total		587	(15)
- * Club domestic league appearances and goals

Sylvain Distin (born 16 December 1977) is a French former professional footballer. He is left-footed and played as a centre-back, and was also capable of playing at left-back.

Distin began his career playing for French amateur sides, working his way up to professional sides Gueugnon and subsequently Paris Saint-Germain. He moved to England in 2001, first joining Newcastle United on a loan move from PSG, before signing a permanent contract with Manchester City, where he spent five seasons. He then spent two years at Portsmouth where he won the FA Cup, before joining Everton in 2009. In six seasons at Goodison Park, he made 210 appearances across all competitions, leaving in 2015 for AFC Bournemouth.

After one season with Bournemouth, Distin was released when his contract expired in June 2016. He played fifteen consecutive seasons in the Premier League, with over 450 appearances in England's top flight – the most of any foreign outfield player.

== Club career ==
=== Early career ===
Born in Bagnolet, Distin started his career at French non-league side Joué-lès-Tours before moving to Tours a year later, where he played 26 times and scored three goals. He then transferred to Gueugnon of Ligue 2, signing his first professional contract. With Gueugnon he won the Coupe de la Ligue in 2000. His performances for Gueugnon prompted Paris Saint-Germain to sign him, though his time at PSG was short-lived and after a year, Distin went on loan to Newcastle United where he made 35 appearances in all competitions.

=== Manchester City ===
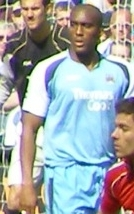
Distin with Manchester City in 2007

Following the loan spell, Newcastle wanted to sign Distin permanently but he instead opted to sign for Manchester City where he could play in his preferred position of central defence, rather than left-back at Newcastle. The transfer fee was £4 million, setting a club record for a defender. Consistent performances in his first Manchester City season resulted in Distin being named the club's Player of the Year for the 2002–03 season. At the start of the 2003–04 season, Distin was named captain of Manchester City following the retirement of Ali Benarbia. In total, Distin played 207 times for Manchester City and scored six goals.

=== Portsmouth ===
Distin left City at the end of his contract in May 2007, seeking a "fresh challenge", and moved to Portsmouth on a three-year deal. Distin was appointed vice captain by Harry Redknapp and led Portsmouth in Sol Campbell's absences due to injury. At the end of Distin's first season at Fratton Park, he won his first and only major honour in English football, the 2008 FA Cup.

After Sol Campbell's departure from Portsmouth, Distin was named the new club captain.

=== Everton ===
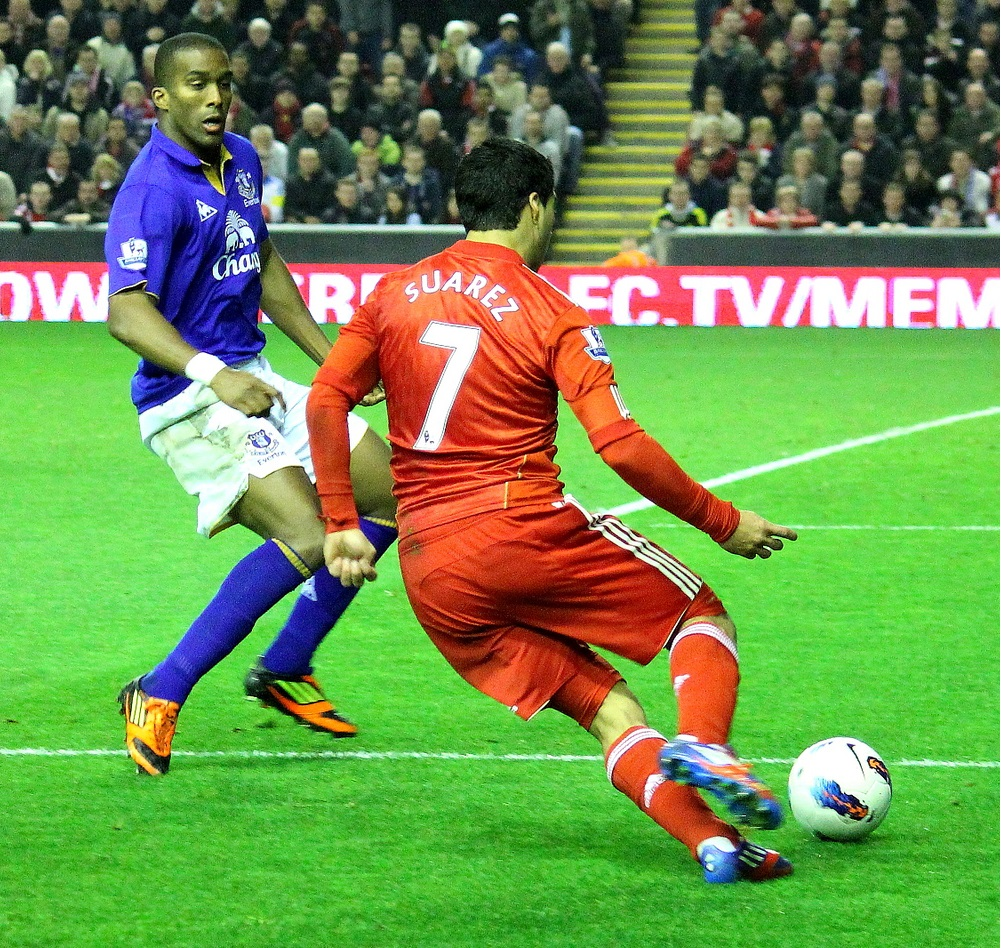
Distin (left, in blue) playing for Everton in a Premier League match against Liverpool on 13 March 2012

In August 2009, Everton signed Distin from Portsmouth for a fee of about £5 million on a three-year contract. He was given the number 15 shirt and made his debut in a 2–1 victory over Wigan Athletic. On 17 September 2009, he scored his first goal for Everton in the UEFA Europa League against Greek team AEK Athens. He scored his second goal for Everton in the UEFA Europa League on 16 February 2010 against Sporting CP to give Everton a 2–1 win. Distin was later sent off resulting in Sporting's goal from the penalty spot after a poor touch following an equally poor Jack Rodwell pass. Distin scored his first league goal for the club against Liverpool on 16 January 2011, heading in from a corner at the start of the second half. During his 2011–12 season, Distin assisted goalkeeper Tim Howard's 100-yard goal, notable as only the fourth goal from a keeper in the history of the Premier League.

On 14 April 2012, he made a rare mistake in the FA Cup semi-final when a poor back pass gifted Luis Suárez the equalising goal for Merseyside rivals Liverpool. Everton went on to lose the game 2–1, and Distin took to Twitter to apologise to the Everton fans. However, he was named Everton's players' player of the year at the end of season awards ceremony, and then agreed a one-year contract extension to stay at the club for the 2012–13 season. On 24 January 2013, Distin signed a new one-year contract with Everton, keeping him at the club until the summer of 2014. On 23 February, he made his 400th Premier League appearance against Norwich City at Carrow Road. A few weeks later he made his 402nd appearance – more than any other foreign outfield player. Distin's centre back partnership with Phil Jagielka remained Everton's first choice through the 2013–14 season, despite the emergence of John Stones, with the club finishing fifth with their record Premier League points tally of 72. He signed a new one-year contract to keep him at the club until the summer of 2015.

=== AFC Bournemouth ===
In June 2015, after being released by Everton at the end of the 2014–15 season, Distin agreed in principle, a free transfer to newly promoted AFC Bournemouth, signing on 1 July.

Distin spent one season with Bournemouth and was released when his contract expired at the end of June 2016.

== International career ==
In 2003 Distin represented the L'équipe de l'amitié in a posthumous testimonial game for his former Manchester City teammate, Marc-Vivien Foé, versus the Cameroon national football team.

In addition to France, Distin was also eligible to play for the non-FIFA affiliated nation of Guadeloupe as his father was born there. Distin was approached to play in the 2011 CONCACAF Gold Cup by the Guadeloupean federation, but he rejected the advances as he didn't feel it would be beneficial for his pre-season routine with Everton.

In March 2013, Distin made his 402nd English Premier League appearance, the most of any foreign outfield player, but he never received any international call-ups. Despite this, Distin stated that he has no regrets over his career. In May 2014, Distin humorously announced his international retirement on Twitter, calling his record of 0 caps for France a "wonderful experience".

== Career statistics ==
=== Club ===
Appearances and goals by club, season and competition
Club	Season	League			Cup		League Cup		Continental		Total	
Club	Season	Division	Apps	Goals	Apps	Goals	Apps	Goals	Apps	Goals	Apps	Goals
Joué-lès-Tours	1997–98	CFA	32	4	?	?	—		—		32	4
Tours	1998–99	CFA	26	3	?	?	—		—		26	3
Gueugnon	1999–2000	Division 2	32	1	3	0	5	0	—		40	1
Paris Saint-Germain	2000–01	Division 1	28	0	1	0	1	0	10	0	40	0
Paris Saint-Germain	2001–02	Division 1	—		—		—		5	0	5	0
Paris Saint-Germain	Total		28	0	1	0	1	0	15	0	45	0
Newcastle United (loan)	2001–02	Premier League	28	0	5	0	2	0	0	0	35	0
Manchester City	2002–03	Premier League	34	0	1	0	1	0	0	0	36	0
Manchester City	2003–04	Premier League	38	2	5	1	2	0	5	0	50	3
Manchester City	2004–05	Premier League	38	1	1	0	2	0	0	0	41	1
Manchester City	2005–06	Premier League	31	0	4	0	1	0	0	0	36	0
Manchester City	2006–07	Premier League	37	2	5	0	1	0	0	0	43	2
Manchester City	Total		178	5	16	1	7	0	5	0	206	6
Portsmouth	2007–08	Premier League	36	0	6	0	3	0	0	0	45	0
Portsmouth	2008–09	Premier League	38	0	3	0	1	0	5	0	47	0
Portsmouth	2009–10	Premier League	3	0	0	0	0	0	0	0	3	0
Portsmouth	Total		77	0	9	0	4	0	5	0	95	0
Everton	2009–10	Premier League	29	0	1	0	2	0	6	2	38	2
Everton	2010–11	Premier League	38	2	4	0	2	0	—		44	2
Everton	2011–12	Premier League	27	0	5	0	1	0	—		33	0
Everton	2012–13	Premier League	34	0	5	0	1	1	—		40	1
Everton	2013–14	Premier League	33	0	2	0	2	0	—		37	0
Everton	2014–15	Premier League	13	0	1	0	1	0	3	0	18	0
Everton	Total		174	2	18	0	9	1	9	2	210	5
Bournemouth	2015–16	Premier League	12	0	3	0	2	0	0	0	17	0
Career total			587	15	55	1	30	1	34	2	706	19

* Doesn't include 2008 FA Community Shield appearance.

== Honours ==
Gueugnon

- Coupe de la Ligue: 1999–2000

Portsmouth

- FA Cup: 2007–08

Individual

- Manchester City Player of the Year: 2002–03
- Everton Players' Player of the Season: 2011–12
