= Nicolas Anelka =

French footballer (born 1979)

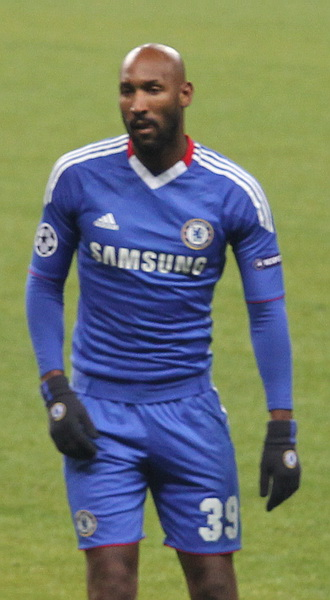
- Anelka playing for Chelsea in 2010

Personal information
- Full name: Nicolas Sébastien Anelka
- Date of birth: 14 March 1979 (age 47)
- Place of birth: Le Chesnay, Yvelines, France
- Height: 1.85 m (6 ft 1 in)
- Position: Forward

Youth career
- 1983–1993: Trappes Saint-Quentin
- 1993–1995: Clairefontaine
- 1995–1996: Paris Saint-Germain

Senior career*
Years	Team	Apps	(Gls)
1996–1997	Paris Saint-Germain	10	(1)
1997–1999	Arsenal	65	(23)
1999–2000	Real Madrid	19	(2)
2000–2002	Paris Saint-Germain	39	(14)
2001–2002	→ Liverpool (loan)	20	(4)
2002–2005	Manchester City	89	(37)
2005–2006	Fenerbahçe	39	(14)
2006–2008	Bolton Wanderers	53	(21)
2008–2012	Chelsea	125	(38)
2012–2013	Shanghai Shenhua	22	(3)
2013	→ Juventus (loan)	2	(0)
2013–2014	West Bromwich Albion	12	(2)
2014–2015	Mumbai City	13	(2)
Total		508	(157)

International career
1997	France U20	3	(0)
1998–2010	France	69	(14)

Managerial career
- 2012: Shanghai Shenhua
- 2015: Mumbai City
Medal record
Men's football
Representing France
UEFA European Championship
Winner	2000
FIFA Confederations Cup
Winner	2001
- * Club domestic league appearances and goals

Nicolas Sébastien Anelka (born 14 March 1979) is a French professional football manager and former player who played as a forward. As a player, he regularly featured in his country's national team, often scoring at crucial moments. Known for his ability to both score and assist goals, he has been described as a classy and quick player, with good aerial ability, technique, shooting, and movement off the ball, and was capable of playing both as a main striker and as a second striker.

Anelka began his career at Paris Saint-Germain, but soon moved to Arsenal. At Arsenal, he won the 1997–98 Premier League and FA Cup double. He became a first team regular and won the PFA Young Player of the Year Award the following season. He moved to Real Madrid for £22.3 million in 1999. He was part of the Real Madrid team that won the 1999–2000 UEFA Champions League, but he did not settle in well and returned to PSG in a £20 million deal. Despite regular first team football in Paris, Anelka set his eyes upon the Premier League once more, moving on loan to Liverpool in January 2002 before joining Manchester City for £13 million at the start of the 2002–03 season.

After three seasons in Manchester, he moved to Turkish club Fenerbahçe for two seasons, before returning to England to join Bolton Wanderers in deals worth £7 million and £8 million respectively. He was then transferred to Chelsea from Bolton for a reported £15 million in January 2008. At Chelsea, he won one Premier League title and two FA Cup trophies, as well as played in the 2007–08 UEFA Champions League final where he missed the decisive penalty in the shootout. In 2009, he won the Premier League Golden Boot award as the league's top goalscorer. During his transfers over the years, he has built an aggregate transfer cost of just under £90 million. After leaving Chelsea in 2012, he had brief stints at Shanghai Shenhua, Juventus, West Bromwich Albion and Mumbai City.

Anelka played 69 times at international level and won his first international honours with France at UEFA Euro 2000, also winning the 2001 FIFA Confederations Cup the following year. His failure to settle at club level limited his international appearances, but he returned to the national team for Euro 2008. On 19 June 2010, he was excluded by the French Football Federation (FFF) from the 2010 World Cup in South Africa for "comments directed against the national coach, Raymond Domenech." He did not play again for the national team.

== Early and personal life ==
Nicolas Sébastien Anelka was born on 14 March 1979 in Le Chesnay, Yvelines, to parents who had moved from Martinique in 1974. Thereafter, they settled in Trappes, near Paris. His childhood friends from Trappes include the actors Omar Sy and Jamel Debbouze. His mother is a secretary in the local high school.

Anelka is married to Barbara Tausia, a Belgian choreographer. Together, they have two sons, Kais, born in 2008, and Kahil, born in 2010. He acted in the 2002 film Le Boulet as a footballer named Nicolas. He said that when he retired from football, he would like to work in the film industry because he has a friend in the business. He said, "I have a friend who's a producer, who makes lots of films. He recently did Astérix. So it's already agreed that I'm going to do other films. It helps to know actors and producers. It's different to football and it's something I enjoy very much because there's no ball. I like pretending to be somebody else, it's fun."

Anelka has two brothers, Claude and Didier.

After discussing religion with some childhood friends, Anelka converted to Islam in 2004 in the United Arab Emirates, taking the Muslim name of "Abdul-Salam Bilal". Anelka has said that he initially fasted during daylight hours as is required for the Muslim month of Ramadan, but "I realised I often got injured just after the period of Ramadan, so I don't observe it strictly any more". Initially, Anelka considered leaving European football to play in the UAE: "I am ready to stay here and to play for a club in the Emirates. I am not keen to go back to England or France." However, this did not come to pass and he briefly moved to Turkey instead, as well as three more English clubs.

Anelka is also known for his friendship with controversial French comedian Dieudonné and Anelka attracted widespread condemnation after performing the quenelle hand gesture, created by Dieudonné and regarded as antisemitic, on the pitch when playing for West Bromwich Albion in 2013. Anelka responded that the gesture was anti-establishment, not antisemitic. An FA disciplinary hearing nonetheless banned Anelka for five matches, but found that he was not antisemitic and had not intended the gesture to express or promote antisemitism. After West Brom suspended him pending their own investigation, Anelka was given notice of termination of his contract by the club due to the club and player being unable to come to terms over the conditions required for the suspension by the club to be lifted, as well as comments made by Anelka on Twitter. In 2020, Anelka said the quenelle was only a protest against his former manager Steve Clarke, who is not Jewish.

Anelka has been the subject of the 2012 Canal+ documentary L'Entrée des Trappistes about his friendship with Sy and Debbouze, and the feature-length 2020 Netflix documentary Anelka: Misunderstood.

== Club career ==
=== Paris Saint-Germain ===
Anelka began his career at Paris Saint-Germain as a youth player at age 16.

=== Arsenal ===
In February 1997, at age 17, Anelka joined Premier League club Arsenal for a £500,000 transfer fee under newly appointed manager Arsène Wenger. The transfer caused controversy in France as Arsenal sought to sign him for free under the precedent of the recent Bosman ruling, despite there being exceptions for players under the age of 24; Wenger said this age restriction was only for domestic transfers.

His first team opportunities were limited in the 1996–97 season, but in 1997–98, he broke into the first team after a long-term injury to striker Ian Wright. In November 1997, Anelka scored his first goal for Arsenal in a 3–2 home win against Manchester United. Anelka was a key player in Arsenal's Double win of both the Premier League and FA Cup that season. Anelka scored the second goal in Arsenal's 2–0 win over Newcastle United in that season's FA Cup final.

Anelka was Arsenal's top scorer in the 1998–99 season with 17 Premier League goals. This form saw him voted the PFA Young Player of the Year, but Arsenal failed to defend their Premier League and FA Cup titles and made little progress in the UEFA Champions League. Fans turned on the striker amid transfer speculation and a perceived lack of enthusiasm, giving him the nickname "Le Sulk". During the close season, Anelka stated a desire to leave Arsenal, claiming the English press was responsible for his unhappiness in England. On 2 August 1999, he joined Real Madrid.

With regard to his time with the Gunners, Anelka later said he believes he should have never left Arsenal, a club that he has great "love" for. Of his former boss at Highbury, Arsène Wenger, Anelka is a huge admirer and a strong supporter of him. Anelka also placed at 29th in the club's compilation of the 50 Greatest Gunners of all-time. In all, he made 90 appearances for Arsenal, scoring 28 goals altogether for the club.

=== Real Madrid ===
In the summer of 1999, Anelka moved to Real Madrid for a £22.3 million transfer fee. He took time to score for the club; on a visit to the football tabloid Marca he played a FIFA game with the staff, who then released the mocking front-page headline "Anelka finally scores a goal...on a video game". He failed to score for Real Madrid in his first five months at the club, eventually recording his first goal in the opening match of the FIFA Club World Championship against Al-Nassr on 5 January 2000. Two days later, he scored twice against Corinthians in the same competition, also missing an 81st-minute penalty kick that would have given him a hat-trick.

On 28 February 2000, Anelka scored his first La Liga goal in a 3–0 defeat of rivals Barcelona in El Clásico at the Santiago Bernabéu Stadium. However, in March, he was suspended by club president Lorenzo Sanz after refusing to train, because of a disagreement with head coach Vicente del Bosque. After returning to the team, Anelka scored in both legs of the Champions League semi-final to give Los Blancos a 3–2 aggregate victory over Bayern Munich and advance to the competition final. He started in the final, held at the Stade de France in his home city of Paris, as Real Madrid ran out 3–0 winners over Valencia to win an eighth European Cup.

=== Return to Paris Saint-Germain ===
Anelka signed a six-year professional contract at Paris Saint-Germain in July 2000, a return to the club at which he used to play as a youth player, in a transfer deal worth £22 million. The Paris club had finished second in Ligue 1 that season, thereby qualifying for the 2000–01 UEFA Champions League. Anelka's return was met with much fanfare. Canal Plus, which owned Paris Saint-Germain, financed the transfer, while PSG sponsor Nike covered much of Anelka's compensation of £30–35,000 per week.

Anelka started well and was appointed captain of a team that was briefly at the top of 2000–01 French Division 1, but the team's form quickly dropped. In December 2000, following a 5–1 loss to Sedan, Philippe Bergeroo was replaced as PSG manager by Luis Fernández. PSG finished ninth in Ligue 1 that season, earning a place in next season's UEFA Intertoto Cup. PSG finished second in the first round of group stage, behind Bayern Munich, but finished bottom of the second group stage, behind Deportivo de La Coruña, Galatasaray and Milan.

However, once again, Anelka developed issues with his head coach, Luis Fernández (who was already under pressure for benching Ronaldinho due to his work ethic).

==== Liverpool (loan) ====
After two and a half years, Anelka returned to the Premier League in December 2001 to join Liverpool on a short-term loan deal until the end of the season, brought in to fill the gap left by Robbie Fowler's departure.

He contributed to Liverpool's late push to come second in the 2001–02 FA Premier League, scoring goals against Everton, Fulham, Blackburn Rovers, Ipswich Town, and in the 2001–02 FA Cup against Birmingham City, but manager Gérard Houllier opted not to offer him a permanent deal after the end of the season in favour of signing Senegalese forward El Hadji Diouf.

=== Manchester City ===
Anelka joined Manchester City on 24 May 2002, with the £13 million transfer fee paid by manager Kevin Keegan, then a club record high. In his first season at City, Anelka was the club's top scorer with 14 goals, including a goal in the last ever Manchester Derby at Maine Road against Manchester United, against former club Arsenal and a last minute winner at Anfield after scoring a penalty just moments earlier. In his second season at City, he finished top scorer again, in the club's first season at the City of Manchester Stadium, with 25 goals. On 16 October 2004, he won and scored a penalty against Chelsea, which led to José Mourinho's first defeat as Chelsea manager.

=== Fenerbahçe ===
In January 2005, Manchester City announced Anelka had completed a £7 million transfer to Turkish team Fenerbahçe. He helped the Turkish club win the Süper Lig title in 2005, and played with them in the UEFA Cup that season, as well as the UEFA Champions League the season after.

=== Bolton Wanderers ===
On 25 August 2006, Bolton Wanderers signed Anelka on a four-year deal for a club record transfer fee of £8 million. He made his debut for Bolton against Watford on 9 September 2006. He opened his account on 19 September in a League Cup match against Walsall, scoring the last goal of a 3–1 away win. After 11 matches without a goal in the Premier League, he scored his first goals – a brace – on 25 November to help down Arsenal 3–1. He finished the 2006–07 Premier League season as Bolton's top scorer with eleven goals.

In January 2007, Anelka stated he would be willing to leave Bolton for a return to former club Arsenal. However, he pledged his future to Bolton in July 2007 following talks with manager Sammy Lee. Anelka later said he would reluctantly consider leaving the club if Bolton's poor start to the 2007–08 season continued, but later signed a new four-year contract lasting until 2011 on 30 August. In June 2020 Anelka admitted he signed the contract so that Bolton could get a bigger transfer fee when he left.

=== Chelsea ===
On 11 January 2008, it was confirmed Anelka would join Chelsea for £15 million. He made his Chelsea debut against Tottenham Hotspur on 12 January 2008, and scored his first goal two weeks later in the FA Cup against Wigan Athletic. He scored his first league goal on 2 February against Portsmouth, but failed to score again for Chelsea during the 2007–08 season.

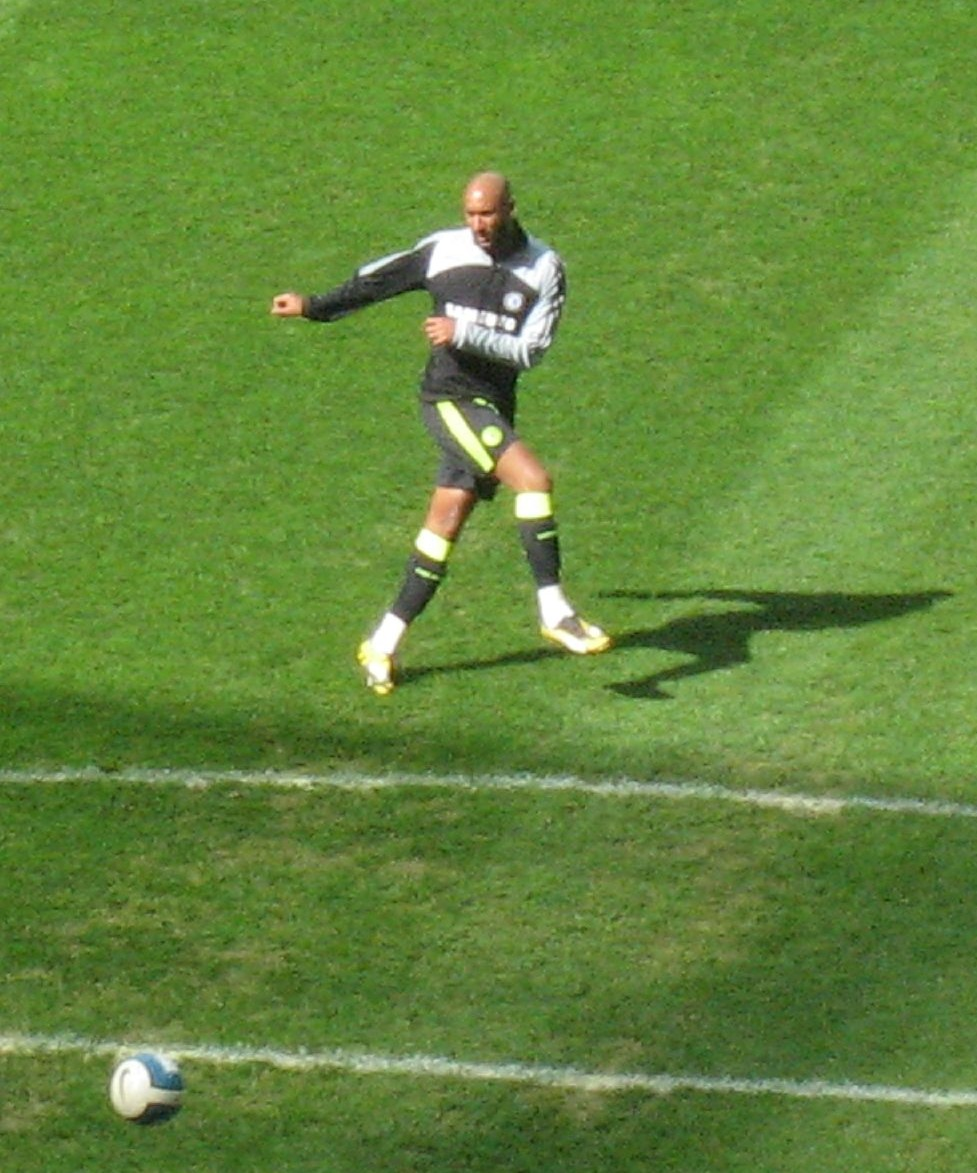
Anelka with Chelsea

In the 2008 Champions League final, Anelka delivered Chelsea's seventh penalty which was saved by Edwin van der Sar, resulting in Manchester United winning the competition. Anelka later blamed manager Avram Grant for his penalty miss, claiming Grant brought him on to play as a late substitute without a proper warm up beforehand and also too late in the game to acclimatize himself in it.

With Didier Drogba injured at the beginning of the 2008–09 season, Anelka made a very impressive start to the campaign. His goalscoring spree won him the Golden Boot Award on 14 November 2008 for being the first player that season to score ten Premier League goals. Anelka scored his first competitive hat-trick for Chelsea against Sunderland, in a 5–0 home win on 1 November 2008, and followed this up with two braces against Blackburn Rovers, then West Bromwich Albion. He established himself as an important member of the squad and maintained his place in the team despite the return to fitness of Drogba. After the arrival of Guus Hiddink, Anelka was more often played on the wing. Furthermore, he was ranked among the top goalscorers in the league for the season. He scored another hat-trick against Watford in the FA Cup to earn Chelsea a 3–1 victory at Vicarage Road. On 10 May, he scored one goal and set up another in a 4–1 away win against former club Arsenal. Anelka did not celebrate the goal which he scored in the game, as he disclosed "he still loved Arsenal". A goal in Chelsea's final Premier League game of the season at Sunderland put him as top goal scorer for the season in the Premier League, earning him the Golden Boot with 19 goals.

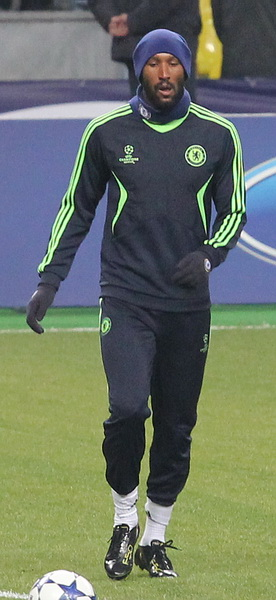
Anelka warming up for Chelsea

Anelka scored his first goal of the 2009–10 season against West London rivals Fulham in a 2–0 win at Craven Cottage, before continuing his fine form with the opening goal in Chelsea's 3–0 win over Burnley the following weekend. He scored his third goal of the season in the opening match of the 2009–10 Champions League group stage in the 1–0 victory over Porto. Anelka scored one of the best goals of his season against APOEL in the Champions League with the ball being passed into the net from outside the box. Anelka scored his third league goal of the season against Liverpool at Stamford Bridge in a 2–0 win with the second goal coming from compatriot Florent Malouda. Anelka continued his fine scoring run in the Champions League with the winner in the 1–0 victory over Porto at the Estádio do Dragão, making Chelsea only the second ever English side to win at Porto's home ground. He continued his scoring in the season by scoring Chelsea's first goal in a 3–3 draw against Everton in the Premier League, his first goal in the competition since October. He followed that up with another goal in Chelsea's 2–1 victory over Portsmouth.

On 16 January 2010, on his return from injury, Anelka scored twice in an astonishing 7–2 victory over Sunderland. He continued this fine form into the next match scoring in an FA Cup tie against Preston North End, bringing his tally in the previous four matches to five goals. After the return of Didier Drogba from the African Cup of Nations, Anelka had been playing on the wing to support him. Anelka scored his first goal since January in a 1–0 win over his former club Bolton in April 2010, putting Chelsea four points ahead of second-place Manchester United. On the final day of the season, Anelka scored two goals against Wigan Athletic, including the first Chelsea goal in the sixth minute, to help Chelsea win their third Premier League title and their first in four years. Anelka (along with Ashley Cole) joined Henning Berg in the exclusive band of players who have won the Premier League title with two different clubs. On 24 June 2010, Chelsea announced Anelka had signed a new one-year extension to his existing contract that will keep him at the club until 2012.

Anelka started the 2010–11 campaign in fine form for Chelsea. He assisted Florent Malouda's last goal against West Brom on the opening day of the Premier League season, scored a double in the next game against Wigan Athletic, then won a penalty against Stoke City in Chelsea's third game of the season. He continued this fine form in Chelsea's first Champions League match, scoring a first half brace against MŠK Žilina. Further goals against Marseille and Spartak Moscow ensured this was the first season since playing for Paris Saint-Germain he had scored at least four goals in a Champions League season. On 19 October, during Chelsea's Champions League group stage match against Spartak, Anelka continued his impressive goal scoring form in the Champions League, scoring the second goal of the match and his 50th goal for Chelsea in the 43rd minute of the game. He ended the 2010–11 season with 16 goals from 45 appearances in all competitions.

Anelka scored Chelsea's first goal of the 2011–12 season against West Brom in a 2–1 Premier League victory. This would prove to be Anelka's final goal for Chelsea, however, as he failed to find the net in 14 further appearances in 2011. On 3 December 2011, after Chelsea's 3–0 victory against Newcastle United, manager André Villas-Boas confirmed to the media that Anelka, along with centre-back Alex, had submitted transfer requests to the club and would be free to leave Chelsea in January. On 12 December, Chelsea confirmed Anelka would join Chinese club Shanghai Shenhua. Zhu Jun, owner of Shanghai Shenhua, confirmed his club had sealed a deal with Anelka in his Weibo on 12 December 2011. This deal was later officially announced by both clubs and was finalized the same day.

In total, Anelka scored 59 goals for Chelsea in 184 appearances.

=== Shanghai Shenhua ===
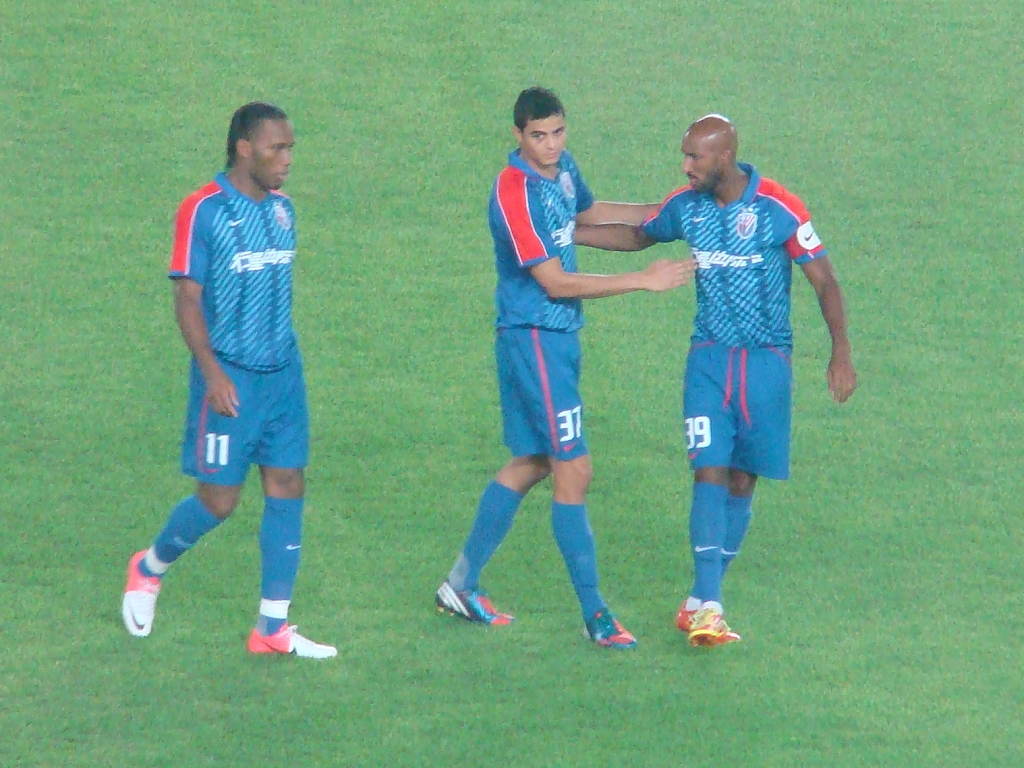
Anelka played with Giovanni Moreno and his former Chelsea teammate Didier Drogba at Shanghai Shenhua.

On 1 January 2012, Anelka moved to Chinese club Shanghai Shenhua, with his annual salary reported to be around €12 million. Following his move, Anelka revealed he turned down the chance to join his former club PSG the previous month in favour of signing for Shanghai Shenhua, and explained that his move was because he did not have attractive offers to remain within Europe. On 21 February 2012, he scored his debut goal in a pre-season friendly match against Hunan Billows, just 40 seconds after the start of the match. Anelka failed to make his Chinese Super League (CSL) debut due to ankle injury on the opening league match of the season against Jiangsu Sainty. He eventually made his CSL debut and scored his first CSL goal on 16 March 2012, in a 3–2 away defeat against bitter rivals Beijing Guoan. On 11 April 2012, Anelka was named as part of the coaching staff to help struggling manager Jean Tigana. Tigana resigned a day later however, and so Anelka was named player-manager in his place. Sergio Batista was named permanent manager a month later.

On 19 June 2012, it was confirmed that Anelka's former Chelsea teammate Didier Drogba would join Shanghai Shenhua. On 7 June 2012, it was claimed Anelka was keen on a move back to the Premier League after he was involved in a heated exchange with a fan for refusing to bow in front of the travelling Shenhua fans with his teammates. Anelka provided two assists for Drogba and headed in a late equaliser to earn Shenhua a point in a 3–3 draw with Shandong Luneng Taishan on 25 August.

==== Juventus (loan) ====
On 26 January 2013, Anelka joined Italian side Juventus on a five-month loan deal. He made his debut for Juventus against Celtic in the Champions League. Anelka made two further appearances for Juventus, both in Serie A, as the club won the league title.

=== West Bromwich Albion ===
On 4 July 2013, Anelka joined West Bromwich Albion on a free transfer after being released by Shanghai Shenhua, marking another return to the Premier League, the sixth Premier League club he has played for in his career. He said he would like to end his career in England, at West Brom. On 22 August 2013, Anelka reportedly walked out of a training session telling staff he was leaving the club to retire. The reports were quickly denied by the club, which confirmed Anelka would miss one match and that he had left the session early on compassionate grounds following the death of his agent. On 28 August 2013, it was announced that since completing his week of compassionate leave, Anelka had decided to remain with the club and would begin training the following day in preparation for West Brom's forthcoming match against Swansea City. He subsequently returned full-time to the team.

Anelka scored his first goal for the club in a 3–3 draw with West Ham United on 28 December 2013, scoring a first-half brace in his first appearance in over two months. During his goal celebration he performed a quenelle, a hand gesture popularized by his comedian friend Dieudonné, described by some critics as an inverted Nazi salute. The Football Association (FA) and anti-racism organisations investigated the incident following allegations of anti-Semitism. On 27 February 2014, an FA disciplinary hearing banned Anelka for five matches, fined him £80,000 and ordered him to complete an educational course. In the hearing, the FA disciplinary hearing panel concluded, "[W]e did not find that Nicolas Anelka is an anti-Semite or that he intended to express or promote anti-Semitism by his use of the quenelle." Anelka and the FA both decided not to appeal this verdict. In the 2020 documentary Anelka: Misunderstood, Anelka said that the quenelle was only a protest at former West Brom manager Steve Clarke, who is not Jewish.

Anelka used social media to announce he was terminating his contract with West Brom. West Brom responded that Anelka had given the club no official notification of his intention to leave, and later gave him 14 days notice of termination from the club for gross misconduct.

=== Mumbai City FC ===
On 15 September 2014, Anelka joined Mumbai City of the newly formed Indian Super League. Following a three-match global ban, he made his debut on 28 October 2014 in a 5–1 defeat at Chennaiyin FC. Five days later, in his first home match at the DY Patil Stadium, Anelka scored the match's only goal to defeat Kerala Blasters. On 5 November, he scored his only other goal of the season, for a home game of the same outcome against the Delhi Dynamos. Anelka played a total of seven matches for Mumbai, as they finished seventh and did not qualify for the end-of-season play-offs.

In January 2015, Anelka had agreed a deal to join Algerian side NA Hussein Dey on an 18-month contract. However, the move was blocked by the Algerian Football Federation as, "Only those aged under 27 and playing on the international level for their countries are allowed to sign up with our clubs." Anelka subsequently returned to Mumbai and was named the team's player-manager on 3 July 2015.

== International career ==
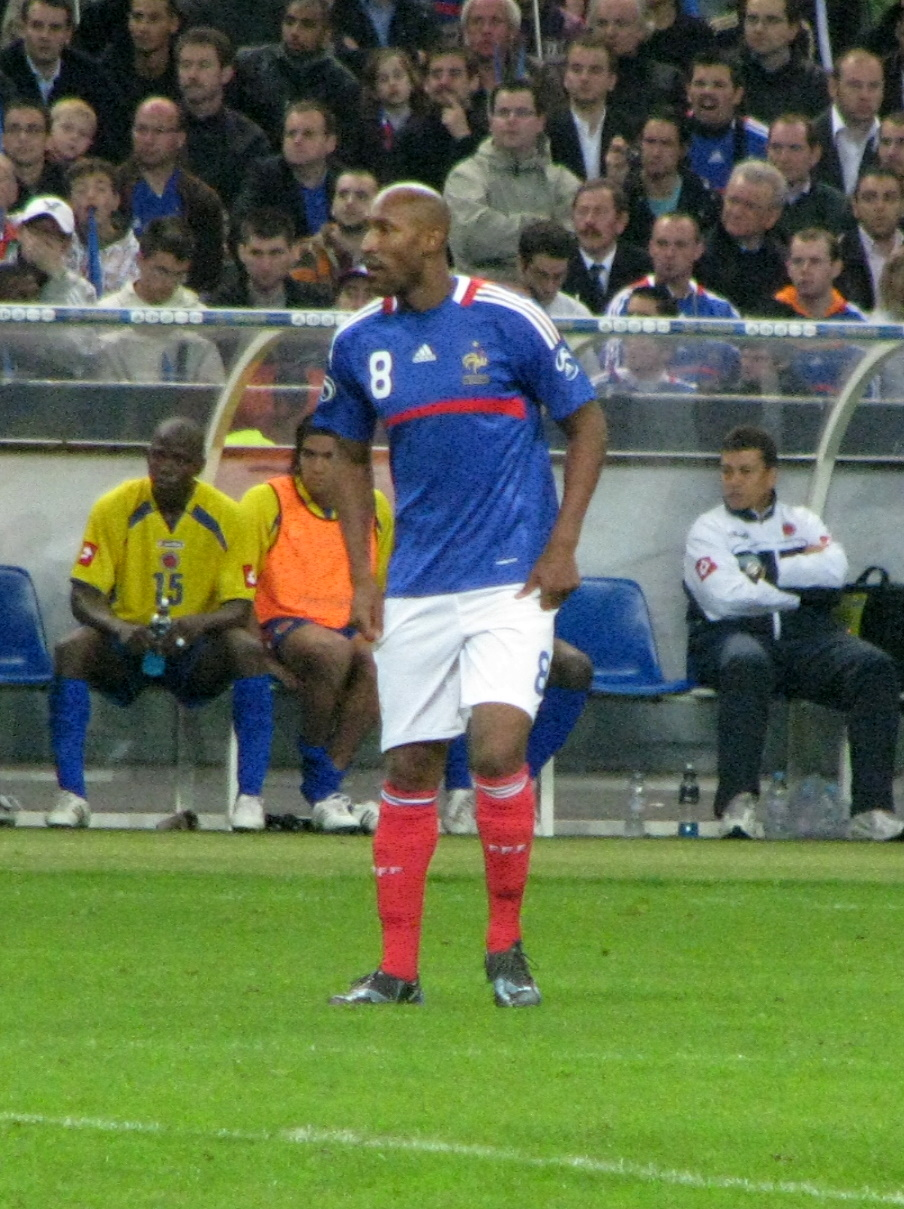
Anelka in action for France during a friendly match against Colombia in April 2008.

At youth level, Anelka played for the French under-20 team at the 1997 World Youth Championship, and made his senior team debut for France in a goalless draw with Sweden national team on 22 April 1998. Anelka was not selected for the 1998 FIFA World Cup-winning squad, but quickly became France's first choice centre forward during the UEFA Euro 2000 qualifying campaign, scoring the opening goal in France's 3–2 win over Russia on his first international start and scoring both goals in a comfortable 2–0 win over England at Wembley Stadium in February 1999. Anelka made his first appearance in a major tournament at Euro 2000, which France went on to win. He also formed part of the squad which won the 2001 FIFA Confederations Cup, where he scored his only tournament goal in a 5–0 win over hosts South Korea in the opening game. In November 2002, he rejected an emergency call-up by Jacques Santini to face Serbia and Montenegro and was barred by the manager; in February 2004 he eyed a return for the UEFA Euro 2004 squad as Djibril Cissé was suspended.

In November 2005, now under, Raymond Domenech, Anelka returned to the France squad for a friendly against Costa Rica in Martinique. The match in the homeland of Anelka's parents was the team's first in the French Caribbean. He scored in the 3–2 win. When Cissé was forced out of 2006 World Cup due to injury, Lyon striker Sidney Govou was called up as Cissé's replacement rather than Anelka.

Anelka came on as a substitute in the Euro 2008 qualifier against Lithuania on 24 March 2007, and scored the only goal in a 1–0 victory. Following his performance, Anelka was praised by France manager Raymond Domenech: "It is the Nicolas I like to see... when he shows these qualities, he is a candidate for a permanent place." He also scored in the 2–0 victory against Ukraine on 2 June 2007.

Anelka featured in the France squad for Euro 2008 in Austria and Switzerland. Anelka started France's first group game against Romania, but was substituted after 72 minutes. He did not start either of France's remaining two games in the tournament against the Netherlands and Italy, coming on as a substitute in both games.

Anelka played a key role in France's 2010 World Cup playoff against the Republic of Ireland. He scored the winning goal in the 72nd minute that put France in a good position with one away goal.

During the 2010 World Cup, Anelka was sent home after reportedly abusing coach Raymond Domenech at half-time during the 2–0 defeat to Mexico. Following criticism of his positioning by Domenech, Anelka is reported to have said, "Va te faire enculer, sale fils de pute," meaning, "Go fuck yourself, you dirty son of a whore." The incident was later reported by the media, and the player refused to publicly apologise when asked to do so by French Football Federation (FFF) president Jean-Pierre Escalettes. The next day, the squad refused to go to training in protest against Anelka's expulsion. Anelka was subsequently given an 18-game suspension from international football by the FFF as punishment for his actions, effectively ending his international career. Anelka later claimed to be "dying with laughter" at the 18-match ban, as he had already decided to retire from international play.

Anelka took L'Équipe to court for their front page, demanding €150,000 in compensation. He lost the case as he only denied the wording of the insult that was attributed to him, and not the fact that he made an insult. In a 2018 documentary, Domenech said that Anelka only insulted his management, not him as a person or his mother.

== Retirement ==
After retiring as a player, Anelka joined the technical staff of Dutch Eredivisie side Roda JC in February 2017, claiming he wanted to help his friend and the club's shareholder Aleksey Korotaev. In November 2018, he joined Lille as a youth forwards coach. On 3 February 2021 he became the sporting director of Hyères, under the new ownership of Mourad Boudjellal. He departed three months later, on 4 May, with no first team game taking place during his tenure due to the COVID-19 pandemic in France. On 25 January 2024, Anelka was appointed as president of TFF First League club Ümraniyespor. Less than six months later, on 8 July, Anelka resigned from his position at the club.

== Career statistics ==
=== Club ===
Appearances and goals by club, season and competition
Club	Season	League			National cup		League cup		Continental		Other (Note: Appearances in Trophée des Champions, UEFA Super Cup, Community Shield (1998, 2009, 2010), Supercopa de España, FIFA Club World Cup (2000), Turkish Super Cup, Chinese Super Cup, Supercoppa Italiana)		Total	
Club	Season	Division	Apps	Goals	Apps	Goals	Apps	Goals	Apps	Goals	Apps	Goals	Apps	Goals
Paris Saint-Germain	1995–96	Division 1	2	0	—		—		—		—		2	0
Paris Saint-Germain	1996–97	Division 1	8	1	—		1	0	1	0	—		10	1
Paris Saint-Germain	Total		10	1	–		1	0	1	0	–		12	1
Arsenal	1996–97	Premier League	4	0	—		—		—		—		4	0
Arsenal	1997–98	Premier League	26	6	9	3	3	0	2	0	—		40	9
Arsenal	1998–99	Premier League	35	17	5	0	0	0	5	1	1	1	46	19
Arsenal	Total		65	23	14	3	3	0	7	1	1	1	90	28
Real Madrid	1999–2000	La Liga	19	2	0	0	—		9	2	3	3	31	7
Paris Saint-Germain	2000–01	Division 1	27	8	0	0	1	0	9	5	—		37	13
Paris Saint-Germain	2001–02	Division 1	12	2	—		0	0	7	3	—		19	5
Paris Saint-Germain	Total		39	10	0	0	1	0	16	8	–		56	18
Liverpool (loan)	2001–02	Premier League	20	4	2	1	—		—		—		22	5
Manchester City	2002–03	Premier League	38	14	1	0	2	0	—		—		41	14
Manchester City	2003–04	Premier League	32	16	4	4	2	0	5	4	—		43	24
Manchester City	2004–05	Premier League	19	7	—		0	0	—		—		19	7
Manchester City	Total		89	37	5	4	4	0	5	4	–		103	45
Fenerbahçe	2004–05	Süper Lig	14	4	2	0	—		2	0	—		18	4
Fenerbahçe	2005–06	Süper Lig	25	10	6	2	—		6	0	—		37	12
Fenerbahçe	2006–07	Süper Lig	—		—		—		2	0	—		2	0
Fenerbahçe	Total		39	14	8	2	–		10	0	–		57	16
Bolton Wanderers	2006–07	Premier League	35	11	3	0	1	1	—		—		39	12
Bolton Wanderers	2007–08	Premier League	18	10	—		—		4	1	—		22	11
Bolton Wanderers	Total		53	21	3	0	1	1	4	1	–		61	23
Chelsea	2007–08	Premier League	14	1	3	1	2	0	5	0	—		24	2
Chelsea	2008–09	Premier League	37	19	5	4	0	0	12	2	—		54	25
Chelsea	2009–10	Premier League	33	11	4	1	0	0	7	3	1	0	45	15
Chelsea	2010–11	Premier League	32	6	3	1	1	2	9	7	1	0	46	16
Chelsea	2011–12	Premier League	9	1	0	0	2	0	4	0	—		15	1
Chelsea	Total		125	38	15	7	5	2	37	12	2	0	184	59
Shanghai Shenhua	2012	Chinese Super League	22	3	2	0	—		3	1	—		27	4
Juventus (loan)	2012–13	Serie A	2	0	—		—		1	0	—		3	0
West Bromwich Albion	2013–14	Premier League	12	2	0	0	0	0	—		—		12	2
Mumbai City	2014	Indian Super League	7	2	0	0	—		—		—		7	2
Mumbai City	2015	Indian Super League	6	0	0	0	—		—		—		6	0
Mumbai City	Total		13	2	0	0	–		–		–		13	2
Career total			508	157	49	17	15	3	93	29	6	4	671	210

=== International ===
Appearances and goals by national team and year
National team	Year	Apps	Goals
France	1998	3	1
France	1999	7	2
France	2000	10 (Note: One appearance and one goal from the match against FIFA XI on 16 August 2000 which FIFA and the French Football Federation count as an official friendly match.)	2
France	2001	7	1
France	2002	1	0
France	2003	0	0
France	2004	0	0
France	2005	2	1
France	2006	3	1
France	2007	10	3
France	2008	11	1
France	2009	9	2
France	2010	6	0
Total		69	14

Scores and results list France's goal tally first, score column indicates score after each Anelka goal.

List of international goals scored by Nicolas Anelka
No.	Date	Venue	Opponent	Score	Result	Competition	Ref.
1	10 October 1998	Luzhniki Stadium, Moscow, Russia	Russia	1–0	3–2	UEFA Euro 2000 qualifying	
2	10 February 1999	Wembley Stadium, London, England	England	1–0	2–0	Friendly	
3	10 February 1999	Wembley Stadium, London, England	England	2–0	2–0	Friendly	
4	6 June 2000	Stade Mohammed V, Casablanca, Morocco	Morocco	4–1	5–1	Friendly	
5	16 August 2000	Stade Vélodrome, Marseille, France	World XI	5–0	5–1	Friendly	
6	30 May 2001	Daegu Stadium, Daegu, South Korea	South Korea	3–0	5–0	2001 FIFA Confederations Cup	
7	9 November 2005	Stade Pierre-Aliker, Fort-de-France, France	Costa Rica	1–2	3–2	Friendly	
8	11 October 2006	Stade Auguste-Bonal, Montbéliard, France	Faroe Islands	3–0	5–0	UEFA Euro 2008 qualifying	
9	24 March 2007	Darius and Girėnas Stadium, Kaunas, Lithuania	Lithuania	1–0	1–0	UEFA Euro 2008 qualifying	
10	2 June 2007	Stade de France, Saint-Denis, France	Ukraine	2–0	2–0	UEFA Euro 2008 qualifying	
11	13 October 2007	Tórsvøllur, Tórshavn, Faroe Islands	Faroe Islands	1–0	6–0	UEFA Euro 2008 qualifying	
12	10 September 2008	Stade de France, Saint-Denis, France	Serbia	2–0	2–1	2010 FIFA World Cup qualification	
13	10 October 2009	Stade de Roudourou, Guingamp, France	Faroe Islands	4–0	5–0	2010 FIFA World Cup qualification	
14	14 November 2009	Croke Park, Dublin, Republic of Ireland	Republic of Ireland	1–0	1–0	2010 FIFA World Cup qualification	

== Honours ==
Arsenal

- Premier League: 1997–98
- FA Cup: 1997–98
- FA Charity Shield: 1998

Real Madrid

- UEFA Champions League: 1999–2000

Paris Saint-Germain

- UEFA Intertoto Cup: 2001

Fenerbahçe

- Süper Lig: 2004–05
- Turkish Cup runner-up: 2005–06

Chelsea

- Premier League: 2009–10
- FA Cup: 2008–09, 2009–10
- FA Community Shield: 2009
- Football League Cup runner-up: 2007–08
- UEFA Champions League: 2011–12; runner-up: 2007–08

France U18

- UEFA European Under-18 Championship: 1997

France

- UEFA European Championship: 2000
- FIFA Confederations Cup: 2001

Individual

- Division 1 Rookie of the Year: 1998
- Premier League Player of the Month: February 1999, November 2008
- PFA Young Player of the Year: 1998–99
- PFA Team of the Year: 1998–99 Premier League, 2008–09 Premier League
- Premier League Golden Boot: 2008–09
