= Tyrone Loran =

Dutch footballer (born 1981)

Personal information
- Full name: Tyrone Gabriel Loran
- Date of birth: 29 June 1981 (age 45)
- Place of birth: Amsterdam, Netherlands
- Height: 6 ft 0 in (1.83 m)
- Position: Defender

Youth career
- Abcoude
- Volendam

Senior career*
Years	Team	Apps	(Gls)
2000–2002	Volendam	25	(1)
2002–2003	Manchester City	0	(0)
2003	→ Tranmere Rovers (loan)	17	(0)
2003–2005	Tranmere Rovers	30	(0)
2005	→ Port Vale (loan)	6	(0)
2005–2007	RBC	77	(4)
2007–2011	NAC Breda	59	(1)
2011	De Graafschap	7	(0)
Total		221	(6)

International career
2000–2002	Netherlands U21		
2008	Netherlands Antilles	5	(1)
- * Club domestic league appearances and goals as of 00:00, 1 July 2011 (UTC)

Tyrone Gabriel Loran (born 29 June 1981) is a former professional footballer who played as a defender. He won five caps for Netherlands Antilles in 2008.

He started his career with Volendam in 2000; two years later, he moved to England to play for Manchester City. The next year, he transferred to Tranmere Rovers following a successful loan spell. In 2005, he played for Port Vale on loan before returning to his homeland to sign for RBC. He moved on to NAC Breda two years later. After four years with Breda, he joined De Graafschap in 2011.

== Club career ==
Loran started his career at the Dutch second-tier club FC Volendam in 2000. In April 2002, he had a trial at English Premier League side Manchester City, and was signed permanently in August for £60,000. He never made a competitive first-team appearance during his season with the club. In December 2002, he left for Tranmere Rovers on loan, and signed a permanent deal with Rovers in May 2003 as the club paid City an undisclosed fee.

Described as a "destroyer" by manager Ray Mathias, he missed three months from late December 2003 to March 2004, due to a knee injury that required surgery. In the 2003–04 season, after he played just two games from the start of season, he left for Port Vale on loan in December 2004. Vale attempted to sign him permanently, but instead he returned to Holland to sign for RBC of the Eredivisie in January 2005.

At the end of 2004–05, his club were in the relegation play-offs, but managed to stay in the top-flight after winning the play-offs. However, a last place finish in 2005–06 ensured their relegation to the Eerste Divisie. In the next season, he made 34 appearances and helped Roosendaal back to the top flight as Eerste Divisie champions.

In the summer of 2007, he joined NAC Breda on a free transfer. He made 14 appearances in 2007–08, as Breda finished third to qualify for the UEFA Intertoto Cup. He made 26 appearances in 2008–09, helping the club again qualify for Europe. He played nine games in 2009–10, as Breda finished mid-table. Following ten appearances in 2010–11, he joined league rivals De Graafschap in January 2011, making a further seven appearances for his new club before the end of the campaign.

== International career ==
An international for the now-defunct Netherlands Antilles side, he helped the nation qualify through the 2010 FIFA World Cup qualification – CONCACAF first round by scoring a goal against group opponents Nicaragua. In the second round the Antilles lost out to Haiti. His international career was ended by the dissolution of the Netherlands Antilles.

== Career statistics ==
=== Club statistics ===
Appearances and goals by club, season and competition
Club	Season	League			FA Cup		League Cup		Other		Total	
Club	Season	Division	Apps	Goals	Apps	Goals	Apps	Goals	Apps	Goals	Apps	Goals
Volendam	2000–01	Eerste Divisie	5	0	—		—		0	0	5	0
Volendam	2001–02	Eerste Divisie	20	1	—		—		0	0	20	1
Volendam	Total		25	1	—		—		0	0	25	1
Manchester City	2002–03	Premier League	0	0	0	0	0	0	—		0	0
Tranmere Rovers	2002–03	Second Division	17	0	0	0	0	0	0	0	17	0
Tranmere Rovers	2003–04	Second Division	28	0	2	0	1	0	1 (Note: Appearance(s) in the EFL Trophy.)	0	32	0
Tranmere Rovers	2004–05	League One	2	0	0	0	0	0	0	0	2	0
Tranmere Rovers	Total		47	0	2	0	1	0	1	0	51	0
Port Vale (loan)	2004–05	League One	6	0	1	0	—		—		7	0
RBC	2004–05	Eredivisie	17	1	—		—		0	0	17	1
RBC	2005–06	Eredivisie	26	1	—		—		0	0	26	1
RBC	2006–07	Eerste Divisie	34	2	—		—		0	0	34	2
RBC	Total		77	4	—		—		0	0	77	4
NAC Breda	2007–08	Eredivisie	14	0	0	0	—		0	0	14	0
NAC Breda	2008–09	Eredivisie	26	1	3	0	—		0	0	29	1
NAC Breda	2009–10	Eredivisie	9	0	0	0	—		5	1	14	1
NAC Breda	2010–11	Eredivisie	10	0	1	0	—		0	0	11	0
NAC Breda	Total		59	1	4	0	—		5	1	68	2
De Graafschap	2010–11	Eredivisie	7	0	0	0	—		0	0	7	0
Career total			221	6	7	0	1	0	6	1	235	7

=== International statistics ===
Netherlands Antilles national team
Year	Apps	Goals
2008	5	1
Total	41	0

== Honours ==
RBC Roosendaal

- Eerste Divisie: 2006–07
