= US Joué-lès-Tours =

- Full name: Union Sportive Joué-lès-Tours
- Founded: 1942
- Dissolved: 2008
- Ground: Stade Jean Bouin, Joué-lès-Tours
- League: Division d'Honneur de Centre
- 2007–08: DH Centre, 12th

Union Sportive Joué-lès-Tours was a French football club founded in 1942. The club dissolved in 2008 when they and ASC Joué Touraine merged to form Joué-lès-Tours FCT. They were based in the town of Joué-lès-Tours, Indre-et-Loire and their home stadium was the Stade Jean Bouin. In the 1982–83 season, the side were crowned champions of the Division d'Honneur de Centre, the sixth tier of French football.
