= David Sommeil =

Guadeloupean footballer (born 1974)

Personal information
- Full name: David Laurent Sommeil
- Date of birth: 10 August 1974 (age 52)
- Place of birth: Pointe-à-Pitre, Guadeloupe, France
- Height: 1.79 m (5 ft 10 in)
- Position: Centre-back

Youth career
- 1992–1993: Saint-Lô
- 1993: Caen

Senior career*
Years	Team	Apps	(Gls)
1993–1998	Caen	119	(1)
1998–2000	Rennes	64	(1)
2000–2002	Bordeaux	77	(1)
2002–2006	Manchester City	49	(4)
2004	→ Marseille (loan)	13	(0)
2006–2007	Sheffield United	5	(0)
2007–2008	Valenciennes	20	(0)
Total		347	(7)

International career
2007	Guadeloupe	8	(0)
- * Club domestic league appearances and goals

David Laurent Sommeil (born 10 August 1974) is a Guadeloupean former professional footballer who played as a defender.

He played his entire career in France and England, beginning with Caen and later Rennes and Bordeaux. He then played in the Premier League for both Manchester City and Sheffield United that was separated by a loan spell back in Ligue 1 with Marseille, before retiring in 2008 with Valenciennes. He was capped eight times by the Guadeloupe national team and played in the 2007 CONCACAF Gold Cup.

== Career ==
Born in Pointe-à-Pitre, Guadeloupe, Sommeil started his career with non-league Saint-Lô before turning professional with SM Caen, making his professional debut on 8 February 1994 against Le Havre AC. He subsequently played for Rennes before coming to prominence with Bordeaux, where he was capped by France at 'B' level.

Sommeil was signed by Kevin Keegan for Manchester City in January 2003, signing a three-and-a-half-year contract for a fee of £3 million. Despite an initial run of first team games and being the first Manchester City player to score a league goal at the City of Manchester Stadium in the opening home game of the 2003–04 season, Sommeil lost his place in January and had limited playing for the next two seasons.

In February 2004, he joined Olympique Marseille on loan, in a deal that brought Daniel Van Buyten to England on loan in exchange. He returned to City for the start of the 2004–05 season but was dogged by injuries during the season and only managed two appearances. Sommeil played in just 16 games in 2005–06, partly due to a fractured cheek bone, forcing him to wear a protective mask on his return, and also due to a three-game ban for a challenge on Tottenham Hotspur's Lee Young-Pyo.

Out of contract in May 2006, after less than 50 games for City, he was one of ten players released by Manchester City, but made a quick return to the Premier League when he signed a two-year contract with newly promoted Sheffield United on 24 May 2006. Sommeil made just five league appearances for the club following his move from Manchester City.

On 19 July 2007, Sommeil left Sheffield United and signed a two-year deal with Ligue 1 outfit Valenciennes FC. During a training session on 20 August 2008 with his club Valenciennes he suffered a suspected heart attack. The 34-year-old player collapsed during the session but his exact condition was not immediately known. After six days in a coma he regained consciousness but was still to recover his speech. By 9 October, Sommeil had regained the ability to speak and use both of his arms, and was able to walk again, his condition "improving".

== Honours ==
Caen

- French Division 2: 1996

Bordeaux

- Coupe de la Ligue: 2001–02
