= Christian Negouai =

French footballer (born 1978)

Personal information
- Date of birth: 20 January 1978 (age 48)
- Place of birth: Fort-de-France, Martinique
- Height: 1.93 m (6 ft 4 in)
- Position: Midfielder

Youth career
- 1997–1998: FC Vaulx-en-Velin

Senior career*
Years	Team	Apps	(Gls)
1998–1999	UR Namur		
1999–2001	Charleroi		
2001–2005	Manchester City	6	(1)
2005	→ Coventry City (loan)	1	(0)
2005–2006	Standard Liège		
2006	Aalesund		
2006–2007	FC Brussels	5	(0)
- * Club domestic league appearances and goals

Christian Negouai (born 20 January 1978) is a French former professional footballer who played for as a midfielder.

He notably played in the Premier League for Manchester City and spent a spell on loan with Coventry City. He also played in Belgium with UR Namur, Charleroi and Standard Liège, FC Brussels and with Aalesund in Norway.

== Career ==
Negouai was bought for £1.5 million by Manchester City from Charleroi in 2001. He made six league appearances of which two were match starts and scored once against Rotherham. He also appeared for Manchester City in the UEFA Cup scoring against The New Saints Negouai proved to be a versatile success for Manchester City Reserves in the Premier Reserve League, scoring nine goals in 19 games after being converted to a centre forward from a defensive midfielder although his time at Manchester City was hampered by a serious injury which required operations on both knees restricting his appearances. According to Duncan Alexander, as of January 2019 he remains the only player to be sent off on their one and only Premier League appearance.

Upon joining Standard Liège, Negouai scored the fastest goal in Belgian League history when he struck after just 11 seconds in a 2–0 win over KVC Westerlo.

== Personal life ==
Negouai is a practising Muslim.
