= 1995–96 Arsenal F.C. season =

English football club season

Arsenal F.C.
1995–96 season
- Chairman: Peter Hill-Wood
- Manager: Bruce Rioch
- Stadium: Highbury
- FA Premier League: 5th
- FA Cup: Third round
- League Cup: Semi-finals
- Top goalscorer: League: Ian Wright (15); All: Ian Wright (23)
- Highest home attendance: 38,323 (1 May, vs. Liverpool, FA Premier League)
- Lowest home attendance: 27,194 (3 October, vs. Hartlepool United, League Cup)
Home colours	Away colours	Third colours

The 1995–96 season was Arsenal Football Club's 70th consecutive season in the top flight of English football. Arsenal finished fifth in the FA Premier League (known as the FA Carling Premiership for sponsorship reasons). Bruce Rioch served as Arsenal manager, succeeding George Graham. Arsenal lost to Sheffield United in the third round of the FA Cup and were knocked out of the semifinals of the League Cup by Aston Villa.

== Season summary ==
Bruce Rioch was appointed Arsenal boss on 8 June 1995, and took over an Arsenal side that had finished 12th in the FA Premier League the previous season. Rioch was hired from Bolton Wanderers, after an impressive run culminating in promotion to the Premier League. This also included an FA Cup win against Arsenal in 1994, when they were the holders.

Pre-season signings David Platt and Dennis Bergkamp signaled Rioch's intent to play a more attacking, possession based style. Bergkamp was a club-record signing for Arsenal, costing £7.5 million from Inter Milan. Kevin Campbell and Stefan Schwarz were sold, Paul Davis was freed to join Brentford while Alan Smith confirmed he could no longer play because of his knee injury.

Arsenal made a strong start to the campaign, not losing until matchday 8 at Stamford Bridge. A loss in the North London Derby at White Hart Lane in November was the start of a tough spell however as Arsenal won just three of the next twelve in the Premier League and went out of the FA Cup in the third round to Sheffield United. Arsenal blew their best chance of silverware in February after they went out of the League Cup to eventual winners Aston Villa in the semi-finals.

Rioch did manage to right the ship and lead Arsenal to 5th, on the last day of the season, and a place in the UEFA Cup after losing just two of their final thirteen league matches.

In Rioch's only season, Arsenal saw an improvement from 12th to 5th, improved their goal difference by 14 goals and conceded only 32 goals, a league best. Despite this progress, Rioch had a fallout with Ian Wright, in which Wright ended up turning in a transfer request. Rioch did not get the best out of Bergkamp, nor indeed Wright, but 5th was a creditable finish after the turmoil of George Graham's exit. Still, attendance figures at Highbury were up and the future looked promising for Arsenal.

In the summer of 1996 Rioch clashed with vice-chairman David Dein about transfers. Following Graham's fiasco with an agent that ultimately led to his firing, Arsenal decided that transfers would be dealt with by the board rather than the manager going forward. Rioch and Dein however, failed to see eye to eye about how Arsenal should act in the transfer market. Just days before the start of the next season, by mid-August Bruce Rioch had been sacked.

Rioch's 431 days in charge is the shortest spell of any Arsenal manager since William Elcoat's spell between 1898 and 1899 (when the club was still known as Woolwich Arsenal).

== Players ==
=== Squad information ===
N	Pos.	Nat.	Name	Age	EU	Since	App	Goals	Ends	Transfer fee	Notes
1	GK	(England)	David Seaman	31	EU	1990	38	0		£1,300,000	
2	DF	(England)	Lee Dixon	31	EU	1988	38	2		Undisclosed	
3	DF	(England)	Nigel Winterburn	31	EU	1987	36	2		Undisclosed	
5	DF	(England)	Steve Bould	32	EU	1988	19	0		£390,000	
6	DF	(England)	Tony Adams	28	EU	1983	21	1		Youth system	
7	MF	(England)	David Platt	29	EU	1995	29	6		£4,750,000	
8	FW	(England)	Ian Wright	31	EU	1991	31	15		£2,500,000	
9	MF	(England)	Paul Merson	27	EU	1985	38	5		Youth system	
10	FW	(Netherlands)	Dennis Bergkamp	26	EU	1995	33	11		£7,500,000	
11	MF	(Netherlands)	Glenn Helder	26	EU	1995	24	1		£2,300,000	
12	DF	(England)	Andy Linighan	33	EU	1990	18	0		£1,250,000	
13	GK	(England)	Vince Bartram	33	EU	1994	1	0		£250,000	
14	DF	(England)	Martin Keown	29	EU	1984	34	0		Youth system	
15	MF	(England)	Ray Parlour	22	EU	1992	22	0		Youth system	
16	FW	(Wales)	John Hartson	20	EU	1995	19	4		£2,500,000	
17	MF	(England)	David Hillier	25	EU	1988	5	0		Trainee	
18	MF	(Northern Ireland)	Steve Morrow	25	EU	1988	4	0		Trainee	
19	MF	(Denmark)	John Jensen	30	EU	1992	15	0		£1,100,000	
20	FW	(England)	Chris Kiwomya	25	EU	1995	0	0		£1,250,000	
21	MF	(Republic of Ireland)	Eddie McGoldrick	30	EU	1993	1	0		£1,000,000	
22	MF	(England)	Ian Selley	21	EU	1992	0	0		Youth system	
23	FW	(Scotland)	Paul Dickov	22	EU	1990	7	1		Youth system	
24	MF	(England)	Mark Flatts	22	EU	1990	0	0		Youth system	
25	DF	(Scotland)	Scott Marshall	22	EU	1991	11	1		Youth system	
26	GK	(England)	Lee Harper	23	EU	1994	0	0		£150.000	
27	MF	(England)	Paul Shaw	21	EU	1991	0	0		Youth system	
28	MF	(England)	Stephen Hughes	18	EU	1995	1	0		Trainee	
29	MF	(England)	Adrian Clarke	20	EU	1993	6	0		Youth system	
30	DF	(England)	Gavin McGowan	19	EU	1993	1	0		Trainee	
31	DF	(England)	Matthew Rose	19	EU	1994	4	0		Youth system	

- Last updated: 20 January 2012
- Source: Arseweb (for EU passport, country as international player, contract ending and transfer fee)
- Ordered by squad number.

=== Reserve squad ===
As of 21 January 2012.
Players listed are those that made an appearance for Arsenal's reserve team during the season.

Note: Flags indicate national team as defined under FIFA eligibility rules; some limited exceptions apply. Players may hold more than one non-FIFA nationality.

No.	Pos.	Nation	Player
—	GK	ENG	Vince Bartram
—	GK	ENG	Lee Harper
—	GK	ENG	Noel Imber
—	DF	ENG	Tony Adams
—	DF	ENG	Chris Coffey
—	DF	ENG	Jason Crowe
—	DF	ENG	Timmy Griggs
—	DF	ISL	Valur Gíslason
—	DF	ENG	Andy Linighan
—	DF	WAL	Dafydd Owen
—	DF	ENG	Scott Marshall
—	DF	ENG	Gavin McGowan
—	DF	ENG	Steve Morrow
—	DF	IRL	Roy O'Brien
—	DF	ENG	Ross Taylor
—	DF	ENG	Matthew Rose
—	MF	ENG	Michael Black
—	MF	ENG	Adrian Clarke

No.	Pos.	Nation	Player
—	MF	ENG	Kevin Dennis
—	MF	DEN	John Jensen
—	MF	ENG	Mark Flatts
—	MF	NED	Glenn Helder
—	MF	ENG	David Hillier
—	MF	ENG	Jamie Howell
—	MF	IRL	Eddie McGoldrick
—	MF	ENG	Ray Parlour
—	MF	ENG	David Platt
—	MF	ENG	Paul Shaw
—	MF	ENG	Stephen Hughes
—	FW	SCO	Paul Dickov
—	FW	WAL	John Hartson
—	FW	ENG	Chris Kiwomya
—	FW	ENG	Isaiah Rankin
—	FW	ENG	Paul Read
—	FW	ENG	Jeff Woolsey
—	FW	ENG	Ian Wright

=== In ===
#	Position	Player	Transferred from	Fee	Date	Team	Source
7	MF	(England) David Platt	(Italy) Sampdoria	£4,750,000	11 July 1995	First-team	
10	FW	(Netherlands) Dennis Bergkamp	(Italy) Internazionale	£7,500,000	21 June 1995	First-team	

Total spending: ▼£12,250,000

=== Out ===
#	Position	Player	Transferred to	Fee	Date	Team	Source
15	MF	(Sweden) Stefan Schwarz	(Italy) Fiorentina	£2,300,000	12 July 1995	First-team	
7	FW	(England) Kevin Campbell	(England) Nottingham Forest	Undisclosed	1995	First-team	

Total income: ▲£2,300,000

== Club ==
=== Coaching staff ===
Position	Staff
Manager	(Scotland) Bruce Rioch
Assistant manager	(Scotland) Stewart Houston
First team coach	
Goalkeeping coach	(Scotland) Bob Wilson
Fitness coach	
Physiotherapist	(England) Gary Lewin
Club doctor	
Chief scout	(England) Steve Crowley

Last updated: 21 January 2012

== Competitions ==
=== Results summary ===
Overall								Home						Away					
Pld	W	D	L	GF	GA	GD	Pts	W	D	L	GF	GA	GD	W	D	L	GF	GA	GD
38	17	12	9	49	32	+17	63	10	7	2	30	16	+14	7	5	7	19	16	+3

Last updated: 20 January 2012.
Source: Premier League

=== Results by round ===
Round	1	2	3	4	5	6	7	8	9	10	11	12	13	14	15	16	17	18	19	20	21	22	23	24	25	26	27	28	29	30	31	32	33	34	35	36	37	38
Ground	H	A	A	H	A	H	H	A	A	H	A	H	A	H	H	A	A	H	A	H	H	A	A	H	H	A	A	A	H	A	A	H	H	A	H	A	H	H
Result	D	W	D	D	W	W	W	L	W	W	L	W	L	W	D	D	D	D	L	W	L	L	W	L	D	W	W	D	W	W	L	W	W	L	D	D	D	W
Position	8	5	7	6	6	5	4	6	3	3	4	4	3	3	3	3	3	5	7	5	5	6	5	6	8	7	6	7	5	5	5	5	5	5	5	5	5	5

Source: Competitive matches
A = Away; H = Home; W = Win; D = Draw; L = Loss

=== Pre-season ===
Arsenal spent their initial pre-season in Sweden playing Swedish sides Kristianstads, Gallstads and GAIS. Returning to England, they then played games against Wolverhampton Wanderers, Inter Milan (at home), and St Albans.

29 July 1995 Friendly	Gallstads	1–6	Arsenal	Gallstads
	Unknown		Merson; Jensen; Wright; Dennis Bergkamp	Stadium: Avallagarden; Attendance: 1,834

1 August 1995 Friendly	GAIS Gothenburg	0–2	Arsenal	Gothenburg, Sweden
		Report	Wright; Bergkamp	Stadium: Gamla Ullevi (1916); Attendance: 3,500

4 August 1995 Friendly	Southend United	1–3	Arsenal	Southend-on-Sea
	Iorfa 77'	Report	Platt 7'; Parlour 34'; Helder 72'	Stadium: Roots Hall; Attendance: 8,923

7 August 1995 Friendly	Wolverhampton Wanderers	0–2	Arsenal	Wolverhampton
			Platt; Wright	Stadium: Molineux Stadium; Attendance: 22,500

10 August 1995 Friendly	Arsenal (England)	0–0	(Italy) Internazionale	London
19:45		Report		Stadium: Highbury; Attendance: 37,000; Referee: Dermot Gallagher

15 August 1995 Friendly	St Albans City	0–5	Arsenal	St Albans
			Bergkamp,, Wright; Helder	Stadium: Clarence Park

=== Matches ===
20 August 1995 1	Arsenal	1–1	Middlesbrough	London
16:00	Wright 36'		Barmby 31'	Stadium: Highbury; Attendance: 37,308; Referee: Gerald Ashby

23 August 1995 2	Everton	0–2	Arsenal	Liverpool
19:45		Report	Platt 70'; Wright 87'	Stadium: Goodison Park; Attendance: 35,775; Referee: Keith Burge

26 August 1995 3	Coventry City	0–0	Arsenal	Coventry
15:00		Report		Stadium: Highfield Road; Attendance: 20,600; Referee: Steve Dunn

29 August 1995 4	Arsenal	1–1	Nottingham Forest	London
19:45	Platt 41'		Campbell 63'	Stadium: Highbury; Attendance: 38,248; Referee: Roger Dilkes

10 September 1995 5	Manchester City	0–1	Arsenal	Manchester
16:00			Wright 90'	Stadium: Maine Road; Attendance: 23,994; Referee: Dermot Gallagher

16 September 1995 6	Arsenal	1–0	West Ham United	London
15:00	Wright 75' (pen.)	Report		Stadium: Highbury; Attendance: 38,065; Referee: Alan Wilkie

23 September 1995 7	Arsenal	4–2	Southampton	London
15:00	Bergkamp 17', 68'; Adams 23'; Wright 73'	Report	Watson 24'; Monkou 45'	Stadium: Highbury; Attendance: 38,136; Referee: Robbie Hart

30 September 1995 8	Chelsea	1–0	Arsenal	London
15:00	Hughes 52'	Report		Stadium: Stamford Bridge; Attendance: 31,048; Referee: Martin Bodenham

14 October 1995 9	Leeds United	0–3	Arsenal	Leeds
15:00		Report	Merson 43'; Bergkamp 56'; Wright 86'	Stadium: Elland Road; Attendance: 38,552; Referee: Peter Jones

21 October 1995 10	Arsenal	2–0	Aston Villa	London
15:00	Merson 47'; Wright 78'	Report		Stadium: Highbury; Attendance: 38,271; Referee: Robbie Hart

30 October 1995 11	Bolton Wanderers	1–0	Arsenal	Bolton
20:00	McGinlay 35'	Report		Stadium: Burnden Park; Attendance: 18,862; Referee: Keith Cooper

4 November 1995 12	Arsenal	1–0	Manchester United	London
15:00	Bergkamp 14'	Report		Stadium: Highbury; Attendance: 38,317; Referee: Paul Durkin

18 November 1995 13	Tottenham Hotspur	2–1	Arsenal	Tottenham
15:00	Sheringham 30'; Armstrong 55'	Report	Bergkamp 14'	Stadium: White Hart Lane; Attendance: 32,894; Referee: Alan Wilkie

21 November 1995 14	Arsenal	4–2	Sheffield Wednesday	London
19:45	Bergkamp 3'; Winterburn 53'; Dickov 64'; Hartson 86'	Report	Hirst 9'; Waddle 20'	Stadium: Highbury; Attendance: 34,556; Referee: Roger Dilkes

26 November 1995 15	Arsenal	0–0	Blackburn Rovers	London
12:45		Report		Stadium: Highbury; Attendance: 37,695; Referee: Graham Poll

2 December 1995 16	Aston Villa	1–1	Arsenal	Birmingham
15:00	Yorke 65'	Report	Platt 60'	Stadium: Villa Park; Attendance: 37,770; Referee: Jeff Winter

9 December 1995 17	Southampton	0–0	Arsenal	Southampton
15:00		Report	Adams (red card)	Stadium: The Dell; Attendance: 15,238; Referee: Paul Danson

16 December 1995 18	Arsenal	1–1	Chelsea	London
15:00	Bould (yellow card) (red card); Dixon 88'	Report	Spencer 25'	Stadium: Highbury; Attendance: 38,295; Referee: Gerald Ashby

23 December 1995 19	Liverpool	3–1	Arsenal	Liverpool
15:00	Fowler 40', 59', 78'	Report	Wright 7' (pen.)	Stadium: Anfield; Attendance: 39,806; Referee: Keith Cooper

26 December 1995 20	Arsenal	3–0	Queens Park Rangers	London
12:00	Wright 45'; Merson 61', 84'	Report		Stadium: Highbury; Attendance: 38,259; Referee: Mike Reed

30 December 1995 21	Arsenal	1–3	Wimbledon	London
15:00	Wright 27'	Report	Earle 38', 67'; Holdworth 50'	Stadium: Highbury; Attendance: 37,640; Referee: Steven Lodge

2 January 1996 22	Newcastle United	2–0	Arsenal	Newcastle upon Tyne
19:45	Ginola 1'; Ferdinand 47'	Report		Stadium: St James' Park; Attendance: 36,530; Referee: Dermot Gallagher

13 January 1996 23	Middlesbrough	2–3	Arsenal	Middlesbrough
15:00	Juninho 38'; Stamp 56'	Report	Merson 7'; Platt 59'; Helder 62'	Stadium: Riverside Stadium; Attendance: 29,359; Referee: Graham Poll

20 January 1996 24	Arsenal	1–2	Everton	London
15:00	Wright 38'	Report	Stuart 50'; Kanchelskis 84'	Stadium: Highbury; Attendance: 38,275; Referee: Martin Bodenham

3 February 1996 25	Arsenal	1–1	Coventry City	London
15:00	Bergkamp 24'	Report	Whelan 23'	Stadium: Highbury; Attendance: 35,623; Referee: Steve Dunn

10 February 1996 26	Nottingham Forest	0–1	Arsenal	Nottingham
15:00		Report	Bergkamp 60'	Stadium: City Ground; Attendance: 27,222; Referee: Robbie Hart

24 February 1996 27	West Ham United	0–1	Arsenal	London
15:00		Report	Hartson 2'	Stadium: Boleyn Ground; Attendance: 24,217; Referee: David Elleray

2 March 1996 28	Queens Park Rangers	1–1	Arsenal	London
15:00	Gallen 20'	Report	Bergkamp 49'	Stadium: Loftus Road; Attendance: 17,970; Referee: Paul Alcock

5 March 1996 29	Arsenal	3–1	Manchester City	London
19:45	Hartson 29', 55'; Dixon 41'	Report	Creaney 54'	Stadium: Highbury; Attendance: 34,519; Referee: Peter Jones

16 March 1996 30	Wimbledon	0–3	Arsenal	Wimbledon
15:00		Report	Winterburn 61'; Platt 65'; Bergkamp 83'	Stadium: Selhurst Park; Attendance: 18,335; Referee: Dermot Gallagher

20 March 1996 31	Manchester United	1–0	Arsenal	Manchester
15:00	Cantona 65'	Report		Stadium: Old Trafford; Attendance: 50,028; Referee: Gary Willard

23 March 1996 32	Arsenal	2–0	Newcastle United	London
15:00	Marshall 3'; Wright 17'	Report		Stadium: Highbury; Attendance: 38,271; Referee: Paul Durkin

6 April 1996 33	Arsenal	2–1	Leeds United	London
15:00	Wright 44', 90'	Report	Deane 53'	Stadium: Highbury; Attendance: 37,619; Referee: Jeff Winter

8 April 1996 34	Sheffield Wednesday	1–0	Arsenal	Sheffield
15:00	Degryse 61'	Report		Stadium: Hillsborough Stadium; Attendance: 24,349; Referee: Steve Dunn

15 April 1996 35	Arsenal	0–0	Tottenham Hotspur	London
20:00		Report		Stadium: Highbury; Attendance: 38,273; Referee: Mike Reed

27 April 1996 36	Blackburn Rovers	1–1	Arsenal	Blackburn
15:00	Gallacher 13'	Report	Wright 75' (pen.)	Stadium: Ewood Park; Attendance: 29,834; Referee: Keith Cooper

1 May 1996 37	Arsenal	0–0	Liverpool	London
19:45		Report		Stadium: Highbury; Attendance: 38,323; Referee: Gerald Ashby

5 May 1996 38	Arsenal	2–1	Bolton Wanderers	London
16:00	Platt 82'; Bergkamp 84'	Report	Todd 76'	Stadium: Highbury; Attendance: 38,104; Referee: Gary Willard

=== FA Cup ===
6 January 1996 R3	Arsenal	1–1	Sheffield United	London
15:00	Wright 70'	Report	Whitehouse 78'	Stadium: Highbury; Attendance: 33,453; Referee: Paul Durkin

17 January 1996 R3 Replay	Sheffield United	1–0	Arsenal	Sheffield
19:45	Veart 68'	Report		Stadium: Bramall Lane; Attendance: 22,225; Referee: Paul Durkin

=== League Cup ===
19 September 1995 R2, 1st Leg	Hartlepool United	0–3	Arsenal	Hartlepool
		Report	Adams 5', 11'; Wright 16'	Stadium: Victoria Park; Attendance: 4,945; Referee: Eddie Wolstenholme

3 October 1995 R2, 2nd Leg	Arsenal	5–0	Hartlepool United	London
19:45	Bergkamp 29', 49'; Wright 33', 58', 87'			Stadium: Highbury; Attendance: 27,194; Referee: Steve Dunn

24 October 1995 R3	Barnsley	0–3	Arsenal	Barnsley
19:45		Report	Bould; Bergkamp; Keown	Stadium: Oakwell; Attendance: 18,429; Referee: Jeff Winter

29 November 1995 4	Arsenal	2–1	Sheffield Wednesday	London
19:45	Wright 39' (pen.); Hartson 64'	Report	Degryse 16'	Stadium: Highbury; Attendance: 35,561; Referee: Keith Burge

10 January 1996 Quarter-finals	Arsenal	2–0	Newcastle United	London
20:00	Wright 44', 90'			Stadium: Highbury; Attendance: 37,857; Referee: Gerald Ashby

14 February 1996 Semi-final, 1st leg	Arsenal	2–2	Aston Villa	London
20:00	Bergkamp 26', 37'	Report	Yorke 38', 72'	Stadium: Highbury; Attendance: 37,562; Referee: Paul Durkin

21 February 1996 Semi-final, 2nd leg	Aston Villa	0–0	Arsenal	Birmingham
20:00		Report		Stadium: Villa Park; Attendance: 39,334; Referee: Keith Burge

=== Topscorers ===
- (England) Ian Wright 15
- (Netherlands) Dennis Bergkamp 11
- (England) David Platt 6
- (England) Paul Merson 5
- (Wales) John Hartson 4

== See also ==
- 1995–96 in English football
- List of Arsenal F.C. seasons
