= 1996–97 Arsenal F.C. season =

English football club season

Arsenal F.C.
1996–97 season
- Chairman: Peter Hill-Wood
- Manager: Stewart Houston (caretaker until 12 September); Pat Rice (caretaker until 30 September); Arsène Wenger
- Stadium: Highbury
- FA Premier League: 3rd
- FA Cup: Fourth round
- Football League Cup: Fourth round
- UEFA Cup: First round
- Top goalscorer: League: Ian Wright (23); All: Ian Wright (30)
- Highest home attendance: 38,269 vs Newcastle United (3 May 1997)
- Lowest home attendance: 33,461 vs Sheffield Wednesday (16 September 1996)
- Average home league attendance: 37,056
Home colours	Away colours

The 1996–97 season was Arsenal Football Club's fifth season in the FA Premier League and their 71st consecutive season in the top flight of English football. The club dismissed manager Bruce Rioch in the close season, who spent a year in-charge. After much speculation, Frenchman Arsène Wenger was appointed as his replacement – the club's first manager born outside of the British Isles. At the end of the campaign, Arsenal finished third in the Premier League, narrowly missed out on UEFA Champions League qualification. They made exits in the fourth round of both the FA Cup and Football League Cup to Leeds United and Liverpool respectively. In Europe, the club were eliminated in the UEFA Cup first round to Borussia Mönchengladbach of Germany.

Arsenal sold several fringe players in the transfer window, notably David Hillier to Portsmouth and Paul Dickov to Manchester City. Midfielders Rémi Garde and Patrick Vieira were purchased from RC Strasbourg and Milan respectively. John Hartson moved to West Ham United in January 1997; he was replaced in the squad by teenager Nicolas Anelka, who joined Arsenal a month later from Paris Saint-Germain.

A strong start to their league campaign, with one defeat in their first 12 matches saw Arsenal begin November in first spot. Although the club were winless during the Christmas period, their chances of winning the title remained intact. A run of two draws and losses in February was more severe, as it moved Arsenal down to fourth spot. Draws in April prompted Wenger to rule his team out of the title race and make priority to second spot, which came with a qualifying spot for the Champions League. Defeat to Newcastle United in the penultimate game of the season all but ended Arsenal's chances of finishing second, given Newcastle's superior goal difference. A win on the final day against Derby County meant the club finished third, level on points with Newcastle and Liverpool.

28 different players represented the club in four competitions and there were 12 different goalscorers. Ian Wright was Arsenal's top goalscorer of the season; he scored 30 goals in 41 appearances.

== Background ==
In June 1995, Arsenal appointed Bruce Rioch, who had just guided Bolton Wanderers to the League Cup final and promotion to the top flight, as manager. Under his stewardship, the club broke the English transfer record by paying Internazionale £7.5million for Dutch striker Dennis Bergkamp and the new signing formed an impressive partnership with Ian Wright. Arsenal reached the League Cup semi-finals and finished fifth in the FA Premier League at the end of 1995–96, securing a place in the following season's UEFA Cup.

=== Managerial changes ===
A week before the start of the league season, Arsenal sacked manager Rioch and cited the decision was in the "best long-term interest of the club". It was alleged that a dispute over transfer funds with the board of directors prompted his departure; his relationship moreover with David Dein according to an insider was "no longer cordial". Stewart Houston was once again put in temporary charge, with Pat Rice serving as first team coach. Johan Cruyff was considered the favourite for the job;Terry Venables and David O'Leary were other names linked to the managerial position. Houston put his name forward for the job, but upon being told that he would not be considered, resigned to take over as manager of Division One side Queens Park Rangers, leaving Rice as the team's second caretaker manager of the season. Arsenal would eventually select Frenchman Arsène Wenger as their next manager, but did not officially announce his appointment until September 1996, once his contract with Japanese club Nagoya Grampus Eight was terminated by mutual consent. He became Arsenal's 19th and highest-paid manager, on a three-year, £2 million contract.

=== Transfers ===
==== In ====
No.	Position	Player	Transferred from	Fee	Date	Ref
	DF	Valur Gíslason	KR Reykjavík	Undisclosed	16 July 1996	
24	GK	John Lukic	Leeds United	Free	26 July 1996	
19	DF	Rémi Garde	RC Strasbourg	Free	14 August 1996	
4	MF	Patrick Vieira	AC Milan	£3,500,000	14 August 1996	
11	FW	Nicolas Anelka	Paris Saint-Germain	Undisclosed	22 February 1997	

==== Out ====
No.	Position	Player	Transferred to	Fee	Date	Ref
23	FW	Paul Dickov	Manchester City	£1,000,000	23 August 1996	
21	MF	Eddie McGoldrick	Manchester City	£250,000	31 October 1996	
17	DF	David Hillier	Portsmouth	£250,000	1 November 1996	
16	FW	John Hartson	West Ham United	£5,000,000	14 February 1997	
12	DF	Andy Linighan	Crystal Palace	£500,000	21 January 1997	
18	MF	Steve Morrow	Queens Park Rangers	£500,000	27 March 1997	

== Pre-season ==
19 July 1996 Friendly	St Albans City	0–6	Arsenal	St Albans
			Dixon (?); Merson (?); Hughes (?); Paul Shaw (?)	Stadium: Clarence Park

27 July 1996 Friendly	Birmingham City	1–0	Arsenal	Birmingham
				Stadium: St Andrew's; Attendance: 11,101

31 July 1996 Friendly	Celtic	2–1	Arsenal	Glasgow
			Dixon (?)	Stadium: Celtic Park; Attendance: 47,300

3 August 1996 Richard Gough testimonial	Rangers	3–0	Arsenal	Glasgow
				Stadium: Ibrox Stadium; Attendance: 47,300

7 August 1996 Friendly	Fiorentina	2–0	Arsenal	Florence
				Stadium: Stadio Artemio Franchi; Attendance: 18,000

7 August 1996 Friendly	Benfica	3–1	Arsenal	Florence
				Stadium: Stadio Artemio Franchi; Attendance: 18,000

10 August 1996 John Wark testimonial	Ipswich Town	1–1	Arsenal	Ipswich
			Wright (?)	Stadium: Portman Road; Attendance: 13,850

13 August 1996 Friendly	Northampton Town	3–1	Arsenal	Northampton
			Hartson (?)	Stadium: Sixfields Stadium; Attendance: 7,478

== FA Premier League ==
=== August–October ===
- The Arsenal team for Arsène Wenger's first match as manager, a 2–0 win against Blackburn Rovers.

Arsenal began their league campaign on 17 August 1996, at home to West Ham United. Three minutes before the half-hour, Hartson gave Arsenal the lead, after his initial shot came back off the post, for a tap-in. West Ham conceded a penalty in the second half when Marc Rieper handled Lee Dixon's cross; Bergkamp, in the absence of designated penalty taker Wright, struck the ball low to Luděk Mikloško's right to score the team's second goal. Arsenal suffered their first loss of the league season two days later away to Liverpool; Steve McManaman scored twice in six second half minutes. The team responded with a 2–0 win at Leicester City in a game where Wright started as a substitute but scored the decisive goal. A 3–3 draw with Chelsea in the first week of September was described as "outstanding" by Houston after the team had recovered from a two-goal half-time deficit. Although Linighan scored an injury time equaliser for Arsenal against Aston Villa, The Guardian match report suggested their most obvious problem in the match was "...despite Merson's valiant efforts, a lack of invention in midfield". Wright scored a hat-trick against Sheffield Wednesday on 16 September 1996, to record 100 league goals for Arsenal. The game marked the debut of Patrick Vieira, who came on as a substitute for Ray Parlour. Goals by Hartson and Wright earned the team victory against Middlesbrough, then the team won a third consecutive match – at home to Sunderland – to draw level on points with league leaders Liverpool.

Wenger's first match in charge of Arsenal was against winless Blackburn Rovers on 12 October 1996. Two goals, both scored by Wright, extended Arsenal's winning league run to four matches and helped consolidate their position. A goalless draw at home to Coventry City was marred by an incident involving Wright and Coventry goalkeeper Steve Ogrizovic that resulted in the latter having a broken nose. October concluded with a home fixture against Leeds United; a 3–0 win for Arsenal marked defeat for former manager George Graham, who made his managerial return to Highbury. The team ended the month joint top of the table with Newcastle United, both on 24 points having played 11 games.

=== November–February ===
Arsenal's first fixture of November was against Wimbledon. Wright gave Arsenal the lead after six minutes, only for Vinnie Jones to head in the equaliser close to half-time. Merson scored Arsenal's second, but Marcus Gayle replied immediately, "bund[ling] the ball past (David) Seaman". An own goal by Nigel Winterburn against Manchester United ended the champions' run of three matches without a win and extended a barren run of Arsenal failing to score at Old Trafford since the creation of the Premier League. Wenger told the press he was not despondent about his first defeat as Arsenal manager: "Obviously, the way we lost was difficult to accept, but I'm happy with the way we played. Our organisation was excellent, we kept fighting and I am very optimistic for the future." Attention soon turned to the North London derby, where Arsenal faced Tottenham Hotspur on 24 November 1996. Arsenal had not beaten their neighbours in over three years and Tottenham were unbeaten at Highbury since September 1991. The match had ramifications in the league: a win potentially placed Arsenal in a position to move into first spot, if other results went in their favour. In the match, Wright put Arsenal into the lead through a penalty, but after 57 minutes, Sol Campbell headed on a long throw for Tottenham and the ball fell to Andy Sinton, whose shot "cannoned off the inside of the near post, then hit Lukic on the head and rebounded into the net". Two minutes before the 90-minute mark, Tony Adams scored the winner, and in injury time, Bergkamp added a third: he controlled a high ball with his left foot and evaded his marker Stephen Carr in a tight area to shoot. A 2–1 win against title challengers Newcastle United, having played three-quarters of the match with ten men, moved Arsenal back to the top of the table.

Arsenal moved three points clear at the top of the Premier League with a 3–1 win at home to Southampton in early December. Against Derby County, Vieira scored his first goal for the club to earn Arsenal a point. The team then faced Nottingham Forest, which marked Stuart Pearce's debut as caretaker manager. Arsenal, without Seaman, Adams, Dixon and Vieira, succumbed to a 2–1 defeat, following the dismissal of Wright. The poor form over Christmas continued: Arsenal were held to a goalless draw away to Sheffield Wednesday on Boxing Day and twice let their lead against Aston Villa slip, in spite of playing "...the best 45 minutes of football the Premiership has seen this season." On New Year's Day, Wright scored his 200th English league goal in Arsenal's 2–0 win against Middlesbrough; he began a three-game suspension thereafter, because of his red card against Nottingham Forest. Disciplinary problems continued to beset the club: Bergkamp's dismissal in the team's defeat to Sunderland on 11 January 1997 was Arsenal's fifth in ten matches. Wenger admitted the disciplinary record was in danger of damaging their title challenge, adding, "The other strange fact is that three out of five dismissals have been strikers, when that sort of thing normally happens to defenders. To me, that shows our strikers must be taking their fair share of kicks. When teams play Arsenal, the games are physical and we have to defend ourselves." Arsenal kept up with Manchester United and Liverpool with a win over Everton on 19 January 1997; the result kept them three points behind top spot with a game in hand. At Upton Park, the team recorded their sixth victory in seven visits to West Ham and moved second, behind "the advancing Manchester United".

February saw Arsenal's title challenge take a turn for the worse, as the team went on a four-match winless run. Back-to-back draws against Leeds United and Tottenham Hotspur was followed by defeat to Manchester United. In the latter match, television footage showed Wright aiming a two-footed challenge on opposition goalkeeper Peter Schmeichel, who was advancing to gather the ball in his half. The police stepped in to keep the players apart after the final whistle and informed the referee of the incident, which was to be later included in his report. Wright protested his innocence and complained he was subject to racial abuse by Schmeichel, at which point the FA intervened and met with representatives of both clubs. Both players eventually agreed to end their feud and, by April, released statements highlighting this. The month ended with a home defeat to Wimbledon, which prompted Wenger to rule out their championship hopes: "'Yes, for the title of course,' he replied when asked if the result had ended the team's interest in the Premiership, 'but for Europe, no.'" After 28 games, Arsenal were in fourth position, having played two more games than Newcastle in third and one more than Manchester United, who were six points clear in first.

=== March–May ===
Fair play is an English word. It is not a French word, and it has been copied all over the world. Unfortunately, it does not function any more here.

— Arsène Wenger, 19 April 1997

Bergkamp and Wright scored a goal apiece in Arsenal's 2–0 win against Everton on the first day of March. The team won by an identical scoreline at home to Nottingham Forest a week later and then kept a third consecutive clean sheet against Southampton; midfielders Stephen Hughes and Paul Shaw both got themselves on the scoresheet. Defeat at home to Liverpool on 24 March 1997 was marred by a dubious penalty awarded to striker Robbie Fowler. The player himself "stood and mouthed: 'No penalty!'" given Seaman made no contact in the penalty box, but the referee unaltered his decision. Although Fowler's spotkick was later saved, the ball rebounded to Jason McAteer, who scored. Wenger ruled the team out of the title race again by saying after the match, "Everybody knows now that it was not a penalty, but I can understand that a referee took a wrong decision. That's football and it eliminates our chance of the championship."

Wright scored his 27th goal of the season away at Chelsea in the first week of April; it took him seven goals short of breaking Cliff Bastin's career record at Arsenal. A win against Leicester City was Arsenal's fifth league win in six matches and boosted the club's chances of finishing second, which came with a spot in the Champions League. Wenger assessed that it was "not impossible to win the title", adding "but when you see Manchester United winning again, realistically you would like to be in their position." A last-minute equaliser for Blackburn Rovers against Arsenal on 19 April 1997 was controversial given the manner the opposition had scored; with Hughes cramped, Vieira kicked the ball out in order for his teammate to be treated. It was anticipated that, "by the game's conventions", Blackburn should have thrown the ball back unchallenged, but striker Chris Sutton forced a corner. The result prompted Wenger to rule out any chance of winning the league: "The best team [Manchester United] has won. But the race for second place is still open and for many weeks I have thought that was the best we could achieve." A further draw against Coventry City, who were fighting to stay another season in the top-flight, moved Arsenal to within four points of Manchester United. They had, however, played two games more than the incumbent champions and one more than Liverpool, sitting in third. Robbie Elliott scored the winner for Newcastle United against Arsenal on 3 May 1997, which reignited their chances of finishing second. Arsenal ended their league campaign against Derby County, who staged their final match at the Baseball Ground. In spite of winning by three goals to one, having played with ten men for the majority of the game, they missed out on second by goal difference to Newcastle.

=== Match results ===
17 August 1996 1	Arsenal	2–0	West Ham United	London
15:00 BST	Hartson 27'; Bergkamp 40' (pen.)			Stadium: Highbury; Attendance: 38,056; Referee: Paul Durkin

19 August 1996 2	Liverpool	2–0	Arsenal	Liverpool
20:00 BST	McManaman 68', 74'			Stadium: Anfield; Attendance: 38,103; Referee: Gary Willard

24 August 1996 3	Leicester City	0–2	Arsenal	Leicester
15:00 BST			27' (pen.) Bergkamp; 90' Wright	Stadium: Filbert Street; Attendance: 20,429; Referee: Graham Barber

4 September 1996 4	Arsenal	3–3	Chelsea	London
19:45 BST	Merson 44'; Keown 64'; Wright 77'		6' (pen.) Leboeuf; 30' Vialli; 90' Wise	Stadium: Highbury; Attendance: 38,132; Referee: Keith Burge

7 September 1996 5	Aston Villa	2–2	Arsenal	Birmingham
15:00 BST	Milošević 39', 63'		70' Merson; 90' Linighan	Stadium: Villa Park; Attendance: 37,944; Referee: Mike Riley

16 September 1996 6	Arsenal	4–1	Sheffield Wednesday	London
20:00 BST	Platt 57'; Wright 61' (pen.), 78', 89'		25' Booth	Stadium: Highbury; Attendance: 33,461; Referee: Mike Reed

21 September 1996 7	Middlesbrough	0–2	Arsenal	Middlesbrough
15:00 BST			3' Hartson; 27' Wright	Stadium: Riverside Stadium; Attendance: 29,629; Referee: Martin Bodenham

28 September 1996 8	Arsenal	2–0	Sunderland	London
15:00 BST	Hartson 73'; Parlour 88'			Stadium: Highbury; Attendance: 38,016; Referee: Paul Danson

12 October 1996 9	Blackburn Rovers	0–2	Arsenal	Blackburn
15:00 BST			3', 51' Wright	Stadium: Ewood Park; Attendance: 24,303; Referee: Steve Dunn

19 October 1996 10	Arsenal	0–0	Coventry City	London
15:00 BST				Stadium: Highbury; Attendance: 38,140; Referee: Peter Jones

26 October 1996 11	Arsenal	3–0	Leeds United	London
15:00 BST	Dixon 1'; Bergkamp 5'; Wright 56'			Stadium: Highbury; Attendance: 38,076; Referee: Alan Wilkie

2 November 1996 12	Wimbledon	2–2	Arsenal	London
15:00 GMT	Jones 44'; Gayle 67'		6' Wright; 64' Merson	Stadium: Selhurst Park; Attendance: 25,521; Referee: Paul Alcock

16 November 1996 13	Manchester United	1–0	Arsenal	Manchester
15:00 GMT	Winterburn 63' (o.g.)			Stadium: Old Trafford; Attendance: 55,210; Referee: Graham Poll

24 November 1996 14	Arsenal	3–1	Tottenham Hotspur	London
16:00 GMT	Wright 28' (pen.); Adams 88'; Bergkamp 90'		57' Sinton	Stadium: Highbury; Attendance: 38,264; Referee: David Elleray

30 November 1996 15	Newcastle United	1–2	Arsenal	Newcastle upon Tyne
15:00 GMT	Shearer 21'		11' Dixon; 60' Wright	Stadium: St James' Park; Attendance: 36,565; Referee: Graham Barber

4 December 1996 16	Arsenal	3–1	Southampton	London
19:45 GMT	Merson 43'; Wright 57' (pen.); Shaw 89'		81' Berkovic	Stadium: Highbury; Attendance: 38,033; Referee: Peter Jones

7 December 1996 17	Arsenal	2–2	Derby County	London
15:00 GMT	Adams 45'; Vieira 90'		62' Sturridge; 71' Powell	Stadium: Highbury; Attendance: 38,018; Referee: Martin Bodenham

21 December 1996 18	Nottingham Forest	2–1	Arsenal	Nottingham
15:00 GMT	Haaland 67', 89'		63' Wright	Stadium: City Ground; Attendance: 27,384; Referee: Stephen Lodge

26 December 1996 19	Sheffield Wednesday	0–0	Arsenal	Sheffield
17:45 GMT				Stadium: Hillsborough; Attendance: 23,245; Referee: Roger Dilkes

28 December 1996 20	Arsenal	2–2	Aston Villa	London
15:00 GMT	Wright 13'; Merson 73'		68' Milošević; 74' Yorke	Stadium: Highbury; Attendance: 38,130; Referee: Jeff Winter

1 January 1997 21	Arsenal	2–0	Middlesbrough	London
15:00 GMT	Bergkamp 15'; Wright 44'			Stadium: Highbury; Attendance: 37,573; Referee: Mike Reed

11 January 1997 22	Sunderland	1–0	Arsenal	Sunderland
15:00 GMT	Adams 66' (o.g.)			Stadium: Roker Park; Attendance: 21,154; Referee: Mike Riley

19 January 1997 23	Arsenal	3–1	Everton	London
16:00 GMT	Bergkamp 55'; Vieira 57'; Merson 69'		90' Ferguson	Stadium: Highbury; Attendance: 38,095; Referee: Keith Burge

29 January 1997 24	West Ham United	1–2	Arsenal	London
19:45 GMT	Rose 63' (o.g.)		8' Parlour; 67' Wright	Stadium: Boleyn Ground; Attendance: 24,382; Referee: Martin Bodenham

1 February 1997 25	Leeds United	0–0	Arsenal	Leeds
15:00 GMT				Stadium: Elland Road; Attendance: 35,502; Referee: David Elleray

15 February 1997 26	Tottenham Hotspur	0–0	Arsenal	London
15:00 GMT				Stadium: White Hart Lane; Attendance: 33,039; Referee: Graham Poll

19 February 1997 27	Arsenal	1–2	Manchester United	London
20:00 GMT	Bergkamp 69'		18' A. Cole; 32' Solskjær	Stadium: Highbury; Attendance: 38,172; Referee: Martin Bodenham

23 February 1997 28	Arsenal	0–1	Wimbledon	London
16:00 GMT			21' Jones	Stadium: Highbury; Attendance: 37,854; Referee: Peter Jones

1 March 1997 29	Everton	0–2	Arsenal	Liverpool
15:00 GMT			21' Bergkamp; 27' Wright	Stadium: Goodison Park; Attendance: 36,980; Referee: Paul Danson

8 March 1997 30	Arsenal	2–0	Nottingham Forest	London
15:00 GMT	Bergkamp 50', 79' (pen.)			Stadium: Highbury; Attendance: 38,206; Referee: Mike Reed

15 March 1997 31	Southampton	0–2	Arsenal	Southampton
15:00 GMT			41' Hughes; 72' Shaw	Stadium: The Dell; Attendance: 15,144; Referee: Jeff Winter

24 March 1997 32	Arsenal	1–2	Liverpool	London
20:00 GMT	Wright 78'		50' Collymore; 65' McAteer	Stadium: Highbury; Attendance: 38,068; Referee: Gerald Ashby

5 April 1997 33	Chelsea	0–3	Arsenal	London
11:15 BST			22' Wright; 53' Platt; 80' Bergkamp	Stadium: Stamford Bridge; Attendance: 28,182; Referee: Roger Dilkes

12 April 1997 34	Arsenal	2–0	Leicester City	London
15:00 BST	Adams 35'; Platt 66'			Stadium: Highbury; Attendance: 38,044; Referee: Stephen Lodge

19 April 1997 35	Arsenal	1–1	Blackburn Rovers	London
15:00 BST	Platt 18'		89' Flitcroft	Stadium: Highbury; Attendance: 38,086; Referee: Mike Riley

21 April 1997 36	Coventry City	1–1	Arsenal	Coventry
20:00 BST	Dublin 2'		19' (pen.) Wright	Stadium: Highfield Road; Attendance: 19,998; Referee: Keith Burge

3 May 1997 37	Arsenal	0–1	Newcastle United	London
15:00 BST			44' Elliott	Stadium: Highbury; Attendance: 38,179; Referee: Martin Bodenham

11 May 1997 38	Derby County	1–3	Arsenal	Derby
16:00 BST	Ward 9'		55', 90' Wright; 82' Bergkamp	Stadium: Baseball Ground; Attendance: 18,287; Referee: Paul Durkin

=== Classification ===
Pos	Team	Pld	W	D	L	GF	GA	GD	Pts	Qualification or relegation
1	Manchester United (C)	38	21	12	5	76	44	+32	75	Qualification for the Champions League group stage
2	Newcastle United	38	19	11	8	73	40	+33	68	Qualification for the Champions League second qualifying round
3	Arsenal	38	19	11	8	62	32	+30	68	Qualification for the UEFA Cup first round (Note: Aston Villa was rewarded entry to the UEFA Cup through UEFA Fair Play ranking.)
4	Liverpool	38	19	11	8	62	37	+25	68	Qualification for the UEFA Cup first round
5	Aston Villa	38	17	10	11	47	34	+13	61	Qualification for the UEFA Cup first round

Source: Premier League
Rules for classification: 1) points; 2) goal difference; 3) number of goals scored.
(C) Champions

==== Results summary ====
Overall								Home						Away					
Pld	W	D	L	GF	GA	GD	Pts	W	D	L	GF	GA	GD	W	D	L	GF	GA	GD
38	19	11	8	62	32	+30	68	10	5	4	36	18	+18	9	6	4	26	14	+12

==== Results by round ====
Round	1	2	3	4	5	6	7	8	9	10	11	12	13	14	15	16	17	18	19	20	21	22	23	24	25	26	27	28	29	30	31	32	33	34	35	36	37	38
Ground	H	A	A	H	A	H	A	H	A	H	H	A	A	H	A	H	H	A	A	H	H	A	H	A	A	A	H	H	A	H	A	H	A	H	H	A	H	A
Result	W	L	W	D	D	W	W	W	W	D	W	D	L	W	W	W	D	L	D	D	W	L	W	W	D	D	L	L	W	W	W	L	W	W	D	D	L	W
Position	3	7	3	5	8	7	3	2	2	1	1	1	3	2	1	1	1	2	2	3	2	2	3	2	3	3	3	4	3	2	3	3	2	2	2	2	3	3

A = Away; H = Home; W = Win; D = Draw; L = Loss

== FA Cup ==
Arsenal entered the competition in the third round, by virtue of their Premier League status. Their opening match was a score draw against Sunderland, which highlighted the team's shortcomings in attack, as Wright was out of the side. In the replay staged at Roker Park, Bergkamp scored the opener early in the second half, in what he described as "...not only a beautiful goal, it was an important goal". The player received the ball from Merson and with the Sunderland defence closing in, twice dragged the ball with his studs, before curling it beyond goalkeeper Lionel Pérez' reach. Hughes increased the team's lead on the hour mark, by heading the ball in at the far post; it was his first goal at senior level. Arsenal exited the cup in the fourth round, with defeat to fellow Premier League side Leeds United. Striker Rod Wallace scored the only goal of the match.

4 January 1997 Third round	Arsenal	1–1	Sunderland	London
15:00 GMT	Hartson 10'		20' Gray; (yellow card) Williams; (yellow card) Melville	Stadium: Highbury; Attendance: 37,793; Referee: Steve Dunn

15 January 1997 Third round replay	Sunderland	0–2	Arsenal	Sunderland
19:45 GMT			46' Bergkamp; 65' Hughes	Stadium: Roker Park; Attendance: 15,277; Referee: Steve Dunn

4 February 1997 Fourth round	Arsenal	0–1	Leeds United	London
19:45 GMT	Hughes (yellow card); Merson (yellow card); Hartson (yellow card)		12' Wallace; (yellow card) Halle	Stadium: Highbury; Attendance: 38,115; Referee: Paul Durkin

== Football League Cup ==
Together with the other clubs playing in European competitions, Arsenal entered the Football League Cup in the third round. The team were drawn to face First Division Stoke City, on the week of 21 October 1996. The tie ended 1–1 and was subject to a replay; Wright equalised for Arsenal after Mike Sheron gave Stoke a first half lead. Arsenal won the replay by five goals to two, but exited the cup in the fourth round against league rivals Liverpool – the result marked the first time in four years that Arsenal had conceded four goals. Wenger described Bould's dismissal for a second bookable offence as "hard", before congratulating his opponents: "Liverpool are the best team we have played against since I've been at Arsenal. We didn't deserve to lose to Manchester United but we did deserve to lose to Liverpool."

23 October 1996 Third round	Stoke City	1–1	Arsenal	Stoke-on-Trent
19:45 BST	Sheron 26'		78' Wright; (yellow card) Hartson; (yellow card) Vieira; (yellow card) Winterburn	Stadium: Victoria Ground; Attendance: 20,804; Referee: Keith Burge

13 November 1996 Third round replay	Arsenal	5–2	Stoke City	London
19:45 GMT	Wright 41' (pen.), 63'; Platt 46'; Bergkamp 68'; Merson 73'		35', 88' Sheron	Stadium: Highbury; Attendance: 33,961; Referee: Gary Willard

27 November 1996 Fourth round	Liverpool	4–2	Arsenal	Liverpool
19:45 GMT	McManaman 26'; Fowler 39' (pen.), 52'; Berger 72'; James (yellow card)		13' (pen.), 68' (pen.) Wright; (yellow card) (yellow-red card) 52' Bould	Stadium: Anfield; Attendance: 32,814; Referee: Alan Wilkie

== UEFA Cup ==
Arsenal entered the UEFA Cup in the first round, a competition which they qualified for by virtue of finishing fifth the previous league season. They were drawn to play German team Borussia Mönchengladbach, twice winners of the cup in the 1970s. In the first leg, staged at Highbury, Arsenal lost Bergkamp through injury before the half-hour; the player was replaced by fellow Dutchman Glenn Helder. Monchengladbach took the lead in the 37th minute, after Peter Nielsen's forward pass met Andrzej Juskowiak, who slipped the ball past an advancing Seaman. Moments after the second half commenced, the away team doubled their lead: captain Stefan Effenberg had taken advantage of Linighan's defensive mistake, which allowed him to shoot. Although Seaman saved the first shot, Effenberg followed up and placed the ball into the top corner of the net. Merson half the deficit in the 54th minute, but Stephan Paßlack increased Monchengladbach's advantage with ten minutes to go; he headed the ball unchallenged past Seaman. Wright scored Arsenal's second goal of the match in stoppage time, on a night where Houston admitted it was "my worst night in Europe".

A fortnight later, Arsenal played the second leg, with Adams returning to the side, deployed in a five-man defence. This did not keep Monchengladbach quiet, for it was they who scored the opening goal, through Juskowiak. Wright replied for Arsenal two minutes before the break and the team brought the aggregate scoreline level, when Merson "pump[ed] home a cracking 25-yard drive into the top right-hand corner." Effenberg equalised, by which point Arsenal had made attacking substitutions to score a third goal. Late in the match, Juskowiak scored his second on the counter, to help Monchengladbach win 6–4 on aggregate score. Wenger, who was in attendance, did not precede over the match officially, but suggested "one or two changes" to caretaker manager and later assistant Pat Rice during the interval.

10 September 1996 First leg	Arsenal	2–3	Borussia Mönchengladbach	London
19:45 BST	Merson 54'; Wright 90'		37' Juskowiak; 47' Effenberg; 81' Paßlack	Stadium: Highbury; Attendance: 36,900; Referee: Urs Meier

25 September 1996 Second leg	Borussia Mönchengladbach	3–2 (6–4 agg.)	Arsenal	Cologne
19:45 BST	Juskowiak 23', 89'; Effenberg 75'		43' Wright; 51' Merson	Stadium: Müngersdorfer Stadion; Attendance: 30,000; Referee: Antonio Jesús López Nieto

== Squad statistics ==
Arsenal used a total of 28 players during the 1996–97 season and there were 12 different goalscorers. There were also five squad members who did not make a first-team appearance in the campaign. Bould and Wright featured in 40 matches – the most of any Arsenal player in the campaign; Winterburn started in all 38 league matches. Parlour made the most appearances as a substitute with 15.

The team scored a total of 76 goals in all competitions. The highest scorer was Wright, with 30 goals, followed by Bergkamp who scored 14 goals. Four Arsenal players were sent off during the season: Wright, Bergkamp, Bould and Adams.

Key

No. = Squad number

Pos = Playing position

Nat. = Nationality

Apps = Appearances

GK = Goalkeeper

DF = Defender

MF = Midfielder

FW = Forward

= Yellow cards

= Red cards

Numbers in parentheses denote appearances as substitute. Players with number struck through and marked † left the club during the playing season.

No.	Pos.	Nat.	Name	FA Premier League		FA Cup		League Cup		UEFA Cup		Total		Discipline	
No.	Pos.	Nat.	Name	Apps	Goals	Apps	Goals	Apps	Goals	Apps	Goals	Apps	Goals	A yellow rectangular card	A red rectangular card
1	GK	ENG	David Seaman	22	0	2	0	2	0	2	0	28	0	0	0
2	DF	ENG	Lee Dixon	31 (1)	2	1	0	3	0	1	0	36 (1)	2	8	0
3	DF	ENG	Nigel Winterburn	38	0	2	0	3	0	2	0	45	0	6	0
4	MF	FRA	Patrick Vieira	30 (1)	2	3	0	3	0	1	0	37 (1)	2	12	0
5	DF	ENG	Steve Bould	33	0	3	0	3	0	1 (1)	0	40 (1)	0	6	1
6	DF	ENG	Tony Adams	27 (1)	3	3	0	3	0	1	0	34 (1)	3	6	2
7	MF	ENG	David Platt	27 (1)	4	1	0	3	1	2	0	33 (1)	5	4	0
8	FW	ENG	Ian Wright	30 (5)	23	1	0	3	5	2	2	36 (5)	30	11	1
9	FW	ENG	Paul Merson	33	6	3	0	3	1	2	2	40	9	2	0
10	FW	NED	Dennis Bergkamp	28 (1)	12	2	1	2	1	1	1	33 (1)	14	5	1
~~11~~	MF	NED	Glenn Helder	(2)	0	0	0	0	0	(2)	0	(4)	0	0	0
11	FW	FRA	Nicolas Anelka	(4)	0	0	0	0	0	0	0	(4)	0	0	0
~~12~~	DF	ENG	Andy Linighan	10 (1)	1	0	0	0	0	2	0	12 (1)	1	0	0
14	DF	ENG	Martin Keown	33	1	3	0	3	0	2	0	41	1	8	0
15	MF	ENG	Ray Parlour	17 (13)	2	0	0	(1)	0	1 (1)	0	21 (15)	2	8	0
~~16~~	FW	WAL	John Hartson	14 (5)	3	2	1	1 (2)	0	2	0	18 (8)	4	0	0
~~17~~	DF	ENG	David Hillier	(2)	0	0	0	0	0	0	0	(2)	0	0	0
~~18~~	DF	NIR	Steve Morrow	5 (9)	0	2	0	(2)	0	0	0	7 (11)	0	0	0
19	DF	FRA	Rémi Garde	7 (4)	0	0	0	0	0	0	0	7 (4)	0	2	0
22	MF	ENG	Ian Selley	(1)	0	0	0	0	0	0	0	(1)	0	0	0
23	FW	SCO	Paul Dickov	(1)	0	0	0	0	0	0	0	(1)	0	0	0
24	GK	ENG	John Lukic	15	0	1	0	1	0	0	0	17	0	0	0
25	DF	SCO	Scott Marshall	6 (1)	0	0	0	0	0	0	0	6 (1)	0	1	0
26	GK	ENG	Lee Harper	1	0	0	0	0	0	0	0	1	0	0	0
27	FW	ENG	Paul Shaw	1 (7)	2	(1)	0	0	0	0	0	1 (8)	2	0	0
28	MF	ENG	Stephen Hughes	9 (5)	1	2	1	0	0	0	0	11 (5)	2	2	0
30	DF	ENG	Gavin McGowan	1	0	0	0	0	0	0	0	1	0	0	0
31	DF	ENG	Matthew Rose	1	0	0	0	0	0	0	0	1	0	0	0

== See also ==
- 1996–97 in English football
- List of Arsenal F.C. seasons
