= 1994–95 Arsenal F.C. season =

English football club season

Arsenal F.C.
1994–95 season
- Chairman: Peter Hill-Wood
- Manager: George Graham (until 21 February); Stewart Houston (caretaker from 21 February)
- Stadium: Highbury
- FA Premier League: 12th
- FA Cup: Third round
- League Cup: Quarter–finals
- UEFA Cup Winners' Cup: Runners-up
- European Super Cup: Runners-up
- Top goalscorer: League: Ian Wright (18); All: Ian Wright (30)
- Average home league attendance: 35,330
Home colours	Away colours	Third colours

The 1994–95 season was Arsenal Football Club's 69th consecutive season in the top flight of English football. Arsenal finished twelfth in the FA Premier League. Domestically, Arsenal went out in the third round of the FA Cup to Millwall and in the quarterfinals of the League Cup to Liverpool. Arsenal once again reached the final of the European Cup Winner's Cup but lost 1–2 to Real Zaragoza in extra time. Ian Wright was the club's top scorer.

== Season summary ==
Arsenal finished 12th in the Premier League, their lowest finish since 1976. Arsenal scored in only one of their first five League matches, fell immediately to mid-table mediocrity and stayed there throughout the whole season. Only six points stood between Arsenal and the relegation zone; they were 38 points behind the champions, Blackburn Rovers. Arsenal only scored 52 goals, with Ian Wright accounting for more than a third of those.

Arsenal hosted Queens Park Rangers on 31 December 1994. Danish midfielder John Jensen scored the goal for Arsenal in a 3–1 loss. It turned out to be his one and only goal for the club.

On 18 January 1995 Arsenal were knocked out in the FA Cup in a third round replay by London rivals Millwall. A week earlier Arsenal were also knocked out of the League Cup in the Quarter-final to eventual winners Liverpool, and (as Cup Winners’ Cup holders) also lost the Super Cup Final to AC Milan. In a press conference Paul Merson had admitted an alcohol, cocaine and gambling addiction, and was sent to rehab. Merson eventually made his comeback on 1 February 1995, against AC Milan in the Super Cup at Highbury, coming on as a substitute to an unbelievable reception from the Arsenal fans.

George Graham was sacked on 21 February 1995, and subsequently banned for a year from football by The FA after it was discovered he had accepted an illegal £425,000 payment from Norwegian agent Rune Hauge following Arsenal transfers John Jensen and Pål Lydersen in 1992, two of Hauge's clients. For in his final weeks in charge (in the days before transfer windows had been imposed), Graham bought three new signings - designed, he hoped, to reinvigorate his jaded squad. In came John Hartson, Chris Kiwomya and Dutchman Glenn Helder. Yet between them they made fewer than 100 starts for the club (21 goals) before being quietly offloaded by the club over the next two years.

Graham's assistant Stewart Houston took over as manager until the end of the season. His first match in charge was, in the evening 21 February 1995 the same day Graham was sacked, against Nottingham Forest at Highbury, in a 1–0 victory. Despite winning his first two games in charge, he always seemed to be a stop-gap. The changeover coincided with a run of 6 defeats in 7 games, leaving Arsenal in danger of being relegated just four years after winning the title and two years after their domestic cup double. However, the team rallied in the final weeks and took 8 points from their final 5 games, securing their Premier League spot.

Arsenal reached the European Cup Winners' Cup final for the second year in succession.

Bröndby and Omonia Nicosia were defeated in the opening rounds of the Cup Winners Cup, before a devastating left footed strike from Ian Wright eliminated French side Auxerre in the Quarter Final.

A pendulous 3-2 win over Sampdoria at Highbury, in which Steve Bould netted twice, set Houston's team up for a nervy second leg at Stadio Luigi Ferraris. Roberto Mancini put Sampdoria ahead, before Ian Wright headed home an equaliser. Claudio Bellucci appeared to have broken Arsenal hearts with goals in the 84th and 87th minutes, but Stefan Schwarz's last gasp free kick took the tie to extra time. David Seaman, playing with three broken ribs, was the hero saving three penalties in the shootout, Seaman denied Mihajlović, Jugović and Lombardo's kicks as the Gunners scraped through.

In Paris at Parc des Princes Real Zaragoza won the final, after former Tottenham Hotspur-player Nayim lobbed Seaman from over 40 yards, in the last seconds of extra time.

== Final league table ==
Pos	Team	Pld	W	D	L	GF	GA	GD	Pts	Qualification or relegation
10	Southampton	42	12	18	12	61	63	−2	54	
11	Chelsea	42	13	15	14	50	55	−5	54	
12	Arsenal	42	13	12	17	52	49	+3	51	
13	Sheffield Wednesday	42	13	12	17	49	57	−8	51	Qualification for the Intertoto Cup group stage
14	West Ham United	42	13	11	18	44	48	−4	50	

Source: Premier League
Rules for classification: 1) points; 2) goal difference; 3) number of goals scored.

=== Results summary ===
Overall								Home						Away					
Pld	W	D	L	GF	GA	GD	Pts	W	D	L	GF	GA	GD	W	D	L	GF	GA	GD
42	13	12	17	52	49	+3	51	6	9	6	27	21	+6	7	3	11	25	28	−3

Last updated: 14 May 1995.
Source: Premier League

=== Results by round ===
Round	1	2	3	4	5	6	7	8	9	10	11	12	13	14	15	16	17	18	19	20	21	22	23	24	25	26	27	28	29	30	31	32	33	34	35	36	37	38	39	40	41	42
Ground	H	A	A	H	A	H	A	H	A	H	H	A	H	A	A	H	A	A	H	H	A	H	A	H	A	H	A	H	H	A	H	A	A	A	H	A	H	H	A	H	H	A
Result	W	L	L	D	D	L	W	L	W	W	W	D	D	L	L	D	D	W	L	D	W	L	L	D	W	D	L	D	W	W	L	L	L	L	W	L	L	W	W	D	D	L
Position	2	6	14	13	12	15	14	14	12	11	9	10	10	10	11	12	12	11	11	11	9	13	13	13	11	10	11	12	10	8	9	9	13	14	10	12	12	10	10	10	11	12

Updated to match(es) played on 14 May 1995. Source: Competitive Matches
A = Away; H = Home; W = Win; D = Draw; L = Loss

== Squad ==
Note: Flags indicate national team as defined under FIFA eligibility rules; some limited exceptions apply. Players may hold more than one non-FIFA nationality.

No.	Pos.	Nation	Player
1	GK	ENG	David Seaman
2	DF	ENG	Lee Dixon
3	DF	ENG	Nigel Winterburn
4	MF	ENG	Paul Davis
5	DF	ENG	Andy Linighan
6	DF	ENG	Tony Adams
7	FW	ENG	Kevin Campbell
8	FW	ENG	Ian Wright
9	FW	ENG	Alan Smith
10	MF	ENG	Paul Merson
11	MF	IRL	Eddie McGoldrick
12	DF	ENG	Steve Bould
13	GK	ENG	Vince Bartram
14	DF	ENG	Martin Keown
15	MF	SWE	Stefan Schwarz
16	FW	WAL	John Hartson

No.	Pos.	Nation	Player
17	MF	DEN	John Jensen
18	MF	ENG	David Hillier
19	MF	ENG	Jimmy Carter
21	DF	NIR	Steve Morrow
22	MF	ENG	Ian Selley
23	MF	ENG	Ray Parlour
24	FW	SCO	Paul Dickov
25	MF	ENG	Mark Flatts
26	GK	ENG	Lee Harper
27	DF	SCO	Scott Marshall
28	MF	ENG	Paul Shaw
29	MF	ENG	Stephen Hughes
30	MF	ENG	Adrian Clarke
31	FW	ENG	Chris Kiwomya
32	MF	NED	Glenn Helder
33	DF	ENG	Gavin McGowan

=== Left club during season ===
Note: Flags indicate national team as defined under FIFA eligibility rules; some limited exceptions apply. Players may hold more than one non-FIFA nationality.

No.	Pos.	Nation	Player
20	MF	NOR	Pål Lydersen (to IK Start)

== Squad statistics ==
As of 10 May 1995

No.	Pos	Nat	Player	Total		Premier League		FA Cup		League Cup		UEFA Cup	
No.	Pos	Nat	Player	Apps	Goals	Apps	Goals	Apps	Goals	Apps	Goals	Apps	Goals
1	GK	(England) ENG	David Seaman	48	0	31	0	2	0	6	0	9	0
2	DF	(England) ENG	Lee Dixon	55	1	39	1	2	0	5	0	9	0
3	DF	(England) ENG	Nigel Winterburn	55	0	39	0	2	0	5	0	9	0
4	MF	(England) ENG	Paul Davis	6	1	3+1	1	0	0	2	0	0	0
5	DF	(England) ENG	Andy Linighan	27	2	13+7	2	2	0	2	0	3	0
6	DF	(England) ENG	Tony Adams	40	4	27	3	0+1	0	4	1	8	0
7	FW	(England) ENG	Kevin Campbell	33	5	19+4	4	1+1	0	5	1	1+2	0
8	FW	(England) ENG	Ian Wright	45	30	30+1	18	2	0	3	3	9	9
9	FW	(England) ENG	Alan Smith	27	4	17+2	2	1	0	3	1	4	1
10	MF	(England) ENG	Paul Merson	34	7	24	4	0	0	2	1	8	2
11	MF	(Republic of Ireland) IRL	Eddie McGoldrick	18	0	9+2	0	0	0	3+2	0	1+1	0
12	DF	(England) ENG	Steve Bould	43	2	30+1	0	1	0	5	0	5+1	2
13	GK	(England) ENG	Vince Bartram	12	0	11+0	0	0	0	0+1	0	0	0
14	DF	(England) ENG	Martin Keown	43	1	24+7	1	1+1	0	3+2	0	5	0
15	MF	(Sweden) SWE	Stefan Schwarz	47	4	34	2	1	0	4	0	8	2
16	FW	(Wales) WAL	John Hartson	20	8	14+1	7	0	0	0	0	4+1	1
17	MF	(Denmark) DEN	John Jensen	33	1	24	1	2	0	1+1	0	5	0
18	MF	(England) ENG	David Hillier	17	0	5+4	0	2	0	2	0	2+2	0
19	MF	(England) ENG	Jimmy Carter	3	0	2+1	0	0	0	0	0	0	0
21	DF	(Northern Ireland) NIR	Steve Morrow	22	2	11+4	1	1	0	1+1	1	0+4	0
22	MF	(England) ENG	Ian Selley	17	1	10+3	0	0	0	3	0	1	1
23	MF	(England) ENG	Ray Parlour	45	0	22+8	0	2	0	5	0	7+1	0
24	FW	(Scotland) SCO	Paul Dickov	13	3	4+5	0	0	0	2+2	3	0	0
25	MF	(England) ENG	Mark Flatts	4	0	1+2	0	0+1	0	0	0	0	0
28	MF	(England) ENG	Paul Shaw	1	0	0+1	0	0	0	0	0	0	0
29	MF	(England) ENG	Stephen Hughes	1	0	1	0	0	0	0	0	0	0
30	MF	(England) ENG	Adrian Clarke	1	0	0+1	0	0	0	0	0	0	0
31	FW	(England) ENG	Chris Kiwomya	17	3	5+9	3	0	0	0	0	1+2	0
32	MF	(Netherlands) NED	Glenn Helder	13	0	12+1	0	0	0	0	0	0	0
33	DF	(England) ENG	Gavin McGowan	1	0	1	0	0	0	0	0	0	0

== Results ==
=== Premier League ===
==== Matches ====
20 August 1994 1	Arsenal	3–0	Manchester City	London
15:00 BST	Campbell 2'; McMahon 36' (o.g.); Wright 76'			Stadium: Highbury; Attendance: 38,368

23 August 1994 2	Leeds United	1–0	Arsenal	Leeds
19:45 BST	Whelan 89'			Stadium: Elland Road; Attendance: 34,218

28 August 1994 3	Liverpool	3–0	Arsenal	Liverpool
16:00 BST	Fowler 26', 29', 31'			Stadium: Anfield; Attendance: 30,017

31 August 1994 4	Arsenal	0–0	Blackburn Rovers	London
19:45 BST				Stadium: Highbury; Attendance: 37,629

10 September 1994 5	Norwich City	0–0	Arsenal	Norwich
15:00 BST				Stadium: Carrow Road; Attendance: 17,768

18 September 1994 6	Arsenal	2–3	Newcastle United	London
15:00 BST	Adams 9'; Wright 88'		7', 45' Beardsley; 74' Fox	Stadium: Highbury; Attendance: 36,819

25 September 1994 7	West Ham United	0–2	Arsenal	London
16:00 BST			18' Adams; 54' Wright	Stadium: Boleyn Ground; Attendance: 18,498

1 October 1994 8	Arsenal	1–2	Crystal Palace	London
15:00 BST	Wright 72'		19', 41' Salako	Stadium: Highbury; Attendance: 34,136

8 October 1994 9	Wimbledon	1–3	Arsenal	London
15:00 BST	Jones 82'		11' Wright; 57' Smith; 65' Campbell	Stadium: Selhurst Park; Attendance: 10,842

15 October 1994 10	Arsenal	3–1	Chelsea	London
15:00 BST	Wright 39', 63'; Campbell 54'		34' Wise	Stadium: Highbury; Attendance: 38,234

23 October 1994 11	Arsenal	2–1	Coventry City	London
15:00 BST	Wright 13', 32'		81' Wegerle	Stadium: Highbury; Attendance: 31,725

29 October 1994 12	Everton	1–1	Arsenal	Liverpool
15:00 BST	Unsworth 14'		24' Schwarz	Stadium: Goodison Park; Attendance: 32,003

6 November 1994 13	Arsenal	0–0	Sheffield Wednesday	London
15:00 GMT				Stadium: Highbury; Attendance: 33,705

19 November 1994 14	Southampton	1–0	Arsenal	Southampton
15:00 GMT	Magilton 60'			Stadium: The Dell; Attendance: 15,201

23 November 1994 15	Leicester City	2–1	Arsenal	Leicester
19:45 GMT	Dixon 16' (o.g.); Lowe 28'	Report	19' (pen.) Wright	Stadium: Filbert Street; Attendance: 20,774

26 November 1994 16	Arsenal	0–0	Manchester United	London
15:00 GMT				Stadium: Highbury; Attendance: 38,301

3 December 1994 17	Nottingham Forest	2–2	Arsenal	Nottingham
15:00 GMT	Pearce 36'; Roy 60'		59' Keown; 76' Davis	Stadium: City Ground; Attendance: 21,662

12 December 1994 18	Manchester City	1–2	Arsenal	Manchester
20:00 GMT	Simpson 80'		31' Smith; 34' Schwarz	Stadium: Maine Road; Attendance: 20,500

17 December 1994 19	Arsenal	1–3	Leeds United	London
15:00 GMT	Linighan 86'		24', 85' Masinga; 88' Deane	Stadium: Highbury; Attendance: 38,098

26 December 1994 20	Arsenal	0–0	Aston Villa	London
12:00 GMT				Stadium: Highbury; Attendance: 34,452

28 December 1994 21	Ipswich Town	0–2	Arsenal	Ipswich
19:45 GMT			16' Wright; 79' Campbell	Stadium: Portman Road; Attendance: 22,054

31 December 1994 22	Arsenal	1–3	Queens Park Rangers	London
15:00 GMT	Jensen 64'		3' Gallen; 76' Allen; 77' Impey	Stadium: Highbury; Attendance: 32,393

2 January 1995 23	Tottenham Hotspur	1–0	Arsenal	London
19:45 GMT	Popescu 22'		Schwarz (yellow card) (red card)	Stadium: White Hart Lane; Attendance: 28,747

14 January 1995 24	Arsenal	1–1	Everton	London
15:00 GMT	Wright 4'		13' Watson	Stadium: Highbury; Attendance: 34,743

21 January 1995 25	Coventry City	0–1	Arsenal	Coventry
19:45 GMT			78' Hartson	Stadium: Highfield Road; Attendance: 14,468

24 January 1995 26	Arsenal	1–1	Southampton	London
19:45 GMT	Hartson 21'		74' Magilton	Stadium: Highbury; Attendance: 27,213

4 February 1995 27	Sheffield Wednesday	3–1	Arsenal	Sheffield
15:00 GMT	Petrescu 8'; Ingesson 25'; Bright 90'		3' Linighan	Stadium: Hillsborough; Attendance: 23,468

11 February 1995 28	Arsenal	1–1	Leicester City	London
15:00 GMT	Merson 52'		78' Draper	Stadium: Highbury; Attendance: 31,373

21 February 1995 29	Arsenal	1–0	Nottingham Forest	London
19:45 GMT	Kiwomya 81'			Stadium: Highbury; Attendance: 35,441

25 February 1995 30	Crystal Palace	0–3	Arsenal	London
15:00 GMT			24' Merson; 39', 77' Kiwomya	Stadium: Selhurst Park; Attendance: 17,092

5 March 1995 31	Arsenal	0–1	West Ham United	London
15:00 GMT			20' Hutchison	Stadium: Highbury; Attendance: 36,295

8 March 1995 32	Blackburn Rovers	3–1	Arsenal	Blackburn
19:45 GMT	Shearer 4', 48'; Le Saux 18'		49' Morrow	Stadium: Ewood Park; Attendance: 23,452

19 March 1995 33	Newcastle United	1–0	Arsenal	Newcastle upon Tyne
15:00 GMT	Beardsley 89'			Stadium: St James' Park; Attendance: 35,611

22 March 1995 34	Manchester United	3–0	Arsenal	Manchester
20:00 GMT	Hughes 26'; Sharpe 31'; Kanchelskis 80'			Stadium: Old Trafford; Attendance: 43,623

1 April 1995 35	Arsenal	5–1	Norwich City	London
15:00 BST	Hartson 4', 13'; Dixon 6'; Merson 75'; Newman 90' (o.g.)		32' Cureton	Stadium: Highbury; Attendance: 36,942

8 April 1995 36	Queens Park Rangers	3–1	Arsenal	London
15:00 BST	Impey 27'; Gallen 59'; Ready 82'		89' Adams	Stadium: Loftus Road; Attendance: 16,341

12 April 1995 37	Arsenal	0–1	Liverpool	London
19:45 BST			90' Fowler	Stadium: Highbury; Attendance: 38,036

15 April 1995 38	Arsenal	4–1	Ipswich Town	London
15:00 BST	Merson 33'; Wright 47', 50', 56'		71' Marshall	Stadium: Highbury; Attendance: 36,818

17 April 1995 39	Aston Villa	0–4	Arsenal	Birmingham
15:00 BST		Report	31', 87' Hartson; 33', 72' (pen.) Wright	Stadium: Villa Park; Attendance: 32,005

29 April 1995 40	Arsenal	1–1	Tottenham Hotspur	London
15:00 BST	Wright 61' (pen.)	Report	74' Klinsmann	Stadium: Highbury; Attendance: 39,377

4 May 1995 41	Arsenal	0–0	Wimbledon	London
19:45 BST				Stadium: Highbury; Attendance: 32,822

14 May 1995 42	Chelsea	2–1	Arsenal	London
16:00 BST	Furlong 20'; Stein 52'		23' Hartson	Stadium: Stamford Bridge; Attendance: 32,822

=== UEFA Cup Winners' Cup ===
First round

15 September 1994 1st Leg	Omonia	1–3	Arsenal	Nicosia
20:00 EEST	Malekkos 72'	Report	37', 80' Merson; 50' Wright	Stadium: Makario Stadium; Attendance: 13,954; Referee: Antonio Almeida Marcal (Portugal)

29 September 1994 2nd Leg	Arsenal	3–0 (6–1 agg.)	Omonia	London
20:00 BST	Wright 9', 70'; Schwarz 31'	Report		Stadium: Highbury; Attendance: 24,165; Referee: Juan Ansuátegui Roca (Spain)

Second round

20 October 1994 1st Leg	Brøndby	1–2	Arsenal	Brøndby
20:00 CEST	Strudal 53'	Report	18' Wright; 21' Smith	Stadium: Brøndby Stadium; Attendance: 13,406; Referee: Werner Müller (Switzerland)

3 November 1994 2nd Leg	Arsenal	2–2 (4–3 agg.)	Brøndby	London
20:00 GMT	Wright 27'; Selley 46'	Report	3' Hansen; 71' Eggen	Stadium: Highbury; Attendance: 32,290; Referee: Sergei Khusainov (Russia)

Quarter-finals

2 March 1995 1st Leg	Arsenal	1–1	Auxerre	London
20:00 GMT	Wright 60'	Report	63' Verlaat	Stadium: Highbury; Attendance: 35,208; Referee: Leif Sundell (Sweden)

16 March 1995 2nd Leg	Auxerre	0–1 (1–2 agg.)	Arsenal	Auxerre
21:00 CEST		Report	16' Wright	Stadium: Stade de l'Abbé-Deschamps; Attendance: 22,000; Referee: Vadim Zhuk (Belarus)

Semi-finals

6 April 1995 1st Leg	Arsenal	3–2	Sampdoria	London
20:00 BST	Bould 34', 36'; Wright 69'	Report	51', 77' Jugović	Stadium: Highbury; Attendance: 38,100; Referee: Jaap Uilenberg (Netherlands)

20 April 1995 2nd Leg	Sampdoria	3–2 (a.e.t.) (5–5 agg.) (2–3 p)	Arsenal	Genoa
20:30 CEST	Mancini 14'; Bellucci 82', 85'	Report	61' Wright; 88' Schwarz	Stadium: Stadio Luigi Ferraris; Attendance: 35,000; Referee: Gerd Grabher (Austria)
	Penalties
	Mihajlović (penalty missed); Jugović (penalty missed); Maspero (penalty scored); Mannini (penalty scored); Lombardo (penalty missed)		(penalty scored) Dixon; (penalty missed) McGoldrick; (penalty scored) Hartson; (penalty scored) Adams; (penalty missed) Merson

Final

10 May 1995	Arsenal	1–2 (a.e.t.)	Real Zaragoza	Paris
20:15 CEST	Hartson 75'	Report	67' Esnáider; 119' Nayim	Stadium: Parc des Princes; Attendance: 43,000; Referee: Piero Ceccarini (Italy)

=== European Super Cup ===
1 February 1995 1st Leg	Arsenal	0–0	AC Milan	London
20:00 GMT		Report		Stadium: Highbury; Attendance: 38,044; Referee: Mario van der Ende (Netherlands)

8 February 1995 2nd Leg	AC Milan	2–0 (2–0 agg.)	Arsenal	Milan
19:30 GMT	Boban 41'; Massaro 67'	Report		Stadium: San Siro; Attendance: 23,953; Referee: Hellmut Krug (Germany)

=== FA Cup ===
7 January 1995 R3	Millwall	0–0	Arsenal	London
		Report		Stadium: The Den; Attendance: 17,718; Referee: Stephen Lodge

18 January 1995 R3 Replay	Arsenal	0–2	Millwall	London
		Report	10' Beard; 90' Kennedy	Stadium: Highbury; Attendance: 32,319; Referee: Stephen Lodge

=== League Cup ===
21 September 1994 R2 1st Leg	Hartlepool United	0–5	Arsenal	Hartlepool
		Report	Wright; Adams; Smith; Merson	Stadium: Victoria Park; Attendance: 4,421

5 October 1994 R2 2nd Leg	Arsenal	2–0 (7–0 agg.)	Hartlepool United	London
	Campbell 79'; Dickov 89'	Report		Stadium: Highbury; Attendance: 20,520

26 October 1994 R3	Oldham Athletic	0–0	Arsenal	Oldham
		Report		Stadium: Boundary Park; Attendance: 9,303

9 November 1994 R3 Replay	Arsenal	2–0	Oldham Athletic	London
	Dickov 15', 40'	Report		Stadium: Highbury; Attendance: 22,746

30 November 1994 R4	Arsenal	2–0	Sheffield Wednesday	London
	Morrow; Wright	Report		Stadium: Highbury; Attendance: 27,390

11 January 1995 R5	Liverpool	1–0	Arsenal	Liverpool
	Rush 59'	Report		Stadium: Anfield; Attendance: 35,026; Referee: Philip Don
