= 1993–94 Arsenal F.C. season =

English football club season

Arsenal F.C.
1993–94 season
- Chairman: Peter Hill-Wood
- Manager: George Graham
- Stadium: Highbury
- FA Premier League: 4th
- FA Cup: Fourth round
- League Cup: Fourth round
- FA Charity Shield: Runners-up
- Cup Winners' Cup: Winners
- Top goalscorer: League: Ian Wright (23); All: Ian Wright (35)
- Average home league attendance: 30,563
Home colours	Away colours

The 1993–94 season was Arsenal Football Club's 68th consecutive season in the top flight of English football. Arsenal finished fourth in the Premier League and went out in the fourth round of both the FA Cup and the League Cup. Arsenal won the European Cup Winners' Cup, defeating Parma 1–0 in the final, thanks to a goal from Alan Smith. It was their first European trophy since 1970. Ian Wright was the top scorer in all competitions with 35 goals.

== Season summary ==
1993–94 saw a great deal of change at Arsenal. The season began with the club's longest-serving player, 34-year-old defender David O'Leary, signing for Leeds and out-of-favour defender Colin Pates joining Brighton. Irish winger Eddie McGoldrick was captured from Crystal Palace; his arrival led to the sale of fellow winger Anders Limpar to Everton in March 1994.

Arsenal conquered their goalscoring problems which had restricted them to 10th place a year earlier. This time round they finished fourth in the league, and at one stage looked like the most likely team to threaten Manchester United's lead. But the real success of the campaign was a 1–0 win over Parma in Copenhagen which gave them glory in the European Cup Winners' Cup and their first European trophy since 1970.

Arsenal surrendered their defence of both domestic cup competitions. Their progress in the League Cup was halted in November, when they surrendered the trophy to an Aston Villa side who went on to win it. The defeat brought to an end a 25-match unbeaten cup run for Arsenal. They also lost their defence of the FA Cup to Bolton Wanderers in February.

The close season saw Arsenal make swoops for Swedish midfielder Stefan Schwarz as manager George Graham prepared to maintain an Arsenal side that could challenge on all fronts the following season.

== Players ==
=== Appearances and goals ===
No.	Pos	Nat	Player	Total		Premier League		FA Cup		League Cup		Cup Winners' Cup	
No.	Pos	Nat	Player	Apps	Goals	Apps	Goals	Apps	Goals	Apps	Goals	Apps	Goals
1	GK	(England) ENG	David Seaman	56	0	39	0	3	0	5	0	9	0
2	DF	(England) ENG	Lee Dixon	48	0	32+1	0	3	0	4	0	8	0
3	DF	(England) ENG	Nigel Winterburn	50	0	34	0	3	0	4	0	9	0
4	MF	(England) ENG	Paul Davis	34	0	21+1	0	0	0	1+2	0	9	0
5	DF	(England) ENG	Andy Linighan	27	0	20+1	0	0	0	4	0	1+1	0
6	DF	(England) ENG	Tony Adams	48	4	35	0	3	2	2	0	8	2
7	FW	(England) ENG	Kevin Campbell	52	19	28+9	14	3	0	2+2	1	7+1	4
8	FW	(England) ENG	Ian Wright	52	34	39	23	3	1	4	6	6	4
9	FW	(England) ENG	Alan Smith	41	7	21+4	3	1+1	1	4+1	1	7+2	2
10	MF	(England) ENG	Paul Merson	47	12	24+9	7	2+1	0	4	2	7	3
11	MF	(Republic of Ireland) IRL	Eddie McGoldrick	37	1	23+3	0	1+1	0	4	0	3+2	1
12	DF	(England) ENG	Steve Bould	37	1	23+2	1	3	0	3	0	5+1	0
13	GK	(England) ENG	Alan Miller	4	0	3+1	0	0	0	0	0	0	0
14	DF	(England) ENG	Martin Keown	46	0	23+10	0	2+1	0	3	0	4+3	0
15	MF	(Sweden) SWE	Anders Limpar [S]	12	0	9+1	0	0	0	2	0	0	0
17	MF	(Denmark) DEN	John Jensen	41	0	27	0	0+1	0	5	0	8	0
18	MF	(England) ENG	David Hillier	22	0	11+4	0	3	0	0+1	0	2+1	0
21	DF	(Northern Ireland) NIR	Steve Morrow	13	0	7+4	0	0	0	1	0	1	0
22	MF	(England) ENG	Ian Selley	27	1	16+2	0	0	0	1+1	0	5+2	1
23	MF	(England) ENG	Ray Parlour	32	2	24+3	2	3	0	2	0	0	0
24	MF	(England) ENG	Mark Flatts	3	0	2+1	0	0	0	0	0	0	0
25	MF	(England) ENG	Neil Heaney [S]	2	0	1	0	0	0	0+1	0	0	0
27	FW	(Scotland) SCO	Paul Dickov	1	0	0+1	0	0	0	0	0	0	0

[R] – Reserve team player [L] – Out on loan [S] – Sold

== Results ==
=== Premier League ===
==== Standings ====
Pos	Team	Pld	W	D	L	GF	GA	GD	Pts	Qualification or relegation
2	Blackburn Rovers	42	25	9	8	63	36	+27	84	Qualification for the UEFA Cup first round
3	Newcastle United	42	23	8	11	82	41	+41	77	Qualification for the UEFA Cup first round
4	Arsenal	42	18	17	7	53	28	+25	71	Qualification for the Cup Winners' Cup first round (Note: Arsenal qualified for the Cup Winners' Cup as the defending champions.)
5	Leeds United	42	18	16	8	65	39	+26	70	
6	Wimbledon	42	18	11	13	56	53	+3	65	

Source: Premier League
Rules for classification: 1) points; 2) goal difference; 3) number of goals scored.

==== Results summary ====
Overall								Home						Away					
Pld	W	D	L	GF	GA	GD	Pts	W	D	L	GF	GA	GD	W	D	L	GF	GA	GD
42	18	17	7	53	28	+25	71	10	8	3	25	15	+10	8	9	4	28	13	+15

==== Matches ====
14 August 1993 1	Arsenal	0–3	Coventry City	London
15:00 BST			34', 62', 65' Quinn	Stadium: Highbury; Attendance: 24,897

16 August 1993 2	Tottenham Hotspur	0–1	Arsenal	London
20:00 BST			87' Wright	Stadium: White Hart Lane; Attendance: 28,355

21 August 1993 3	Sheffield Wednesday	0–1	Arsenal	Sheffield
15:00 BST			9' Wright	Stadium: Hillsborough; Attendance: 26,023

24 August 1993 4	Arsenal	2–1	Leeds United	London
19:45 BST	Newsome 2' (o.g.); Merson 57'		70' Strachan	Stadium: Highbury; Attendance: 29,042

28 August 1993 5	Arsenal	2–0	Everton	London
15:00 BST	Wright 48', 78'			Stadium: Highbury; Attendance: 29,063

1 September 1993 6	Blackburn Rovers	1–1	Arsenal	Blackburn
19:45 BST	Gallacher 36'		75' Campbell	Stadium: Ewood Park; Attendance: 14,051

11 September 1993 7	Arsenal	4–0	Ipswich Town	London
15:00 BST	Wright 30'; Campbell 38', 55', 64'			Stadium: Highbury; Attendance: 28,563

19 September 1993 8	Manchester United	1–0	Arsenal	Manchester
16:00 BST	Cantona 38'			Stadium: Old Trafford; Attendance: 44,009

25 September 1993 9	Arsenal	1–0	Southampton	London
15:00 BST	Merson 45'			Stadium: Highbury; Attendance: 26,902

2 October 1993 10	Liverpool	0–0	Arsenal	Liverpool
15:00 BST				Stadium: Anfield; Attendance: 42,750

16 October 1993 11	Arsenal	0–0	Manchester City	London
15:00 BST				Stadium: Highbury; Attendance: 29,567

23 October 1993 12	Oldham Athletic	0–0	Arsenal	Oldham
15:00 BST				Stadium: Boundary Park; Attendance: 12,105

30 October 1993 13	Arsenal	0–0	Norwich City	London
15:00 BST				Stadium: Highbury; Attendance: 30,516

6 November 1993 14	Arsenal	1–2	Aston Villa	London
15:00 GMT	Wright 58'		74' Whittingham; 90' Townsend	Stadium: Highbury; Attendance: 31,773

20 November 1993 15	Chelsea	0–2	Arsenal	London
15:00 GMT		Report	27' Smith; 45' (pen.) Wright	Stadium: Stamford Bridge; Attendance: 26,839

24 November 1993 16	West Ham United	0–0	Arsenal	London
19:45 GMT				Stadium: Boleyn Ground; Attendance: 20,279

27 November 1993 17	Arsenal	2–1	Newcastle United	London
15:00 GMT	Wright 15'; Smith 60'		61' Beardsley	Stadium: Highbury; Attendance: 36,091

4 December 1993 18	Coventry City	1–0	Arsenal	Coventry
15:00 GMT	Quinn 79'			Stadium: Highfield Road; Attendance: 12,722

6 December 1993 19	Arsenal	1–1	Tottenham Hotspur	London
20:00 GMT	Wright 65'		25' Anderton	Stadium: Highbury; Attendance: 35,669

12 December 1993 20	Arsenal	1–0	Sheffield Wednesday	London
16:00 GMT	Wright 90'			Stadium: Highbury; Attendance: 22,026

18 December 1993 21	Leeds United	2–1	Arsenal	Leeds
15:00 GMT	McAllister 21'; Adams 60' (o.g.)		27' Campbell	Stadium: Elland Road; Attendance: 37,515

27 December 1993 22	Swindon Town	0–4	Arsenal	Swindon
12:00 GMT			19', 26', 68' Campbell; 89' Wright	Stadium: County Ground; Attendance: 17,651

29 December 1993 23	Arsenal	3–0	Sheffield United	London
19:45 GMT	Campbell 11', 55'; Wright 40'			Stadium: Highbury; Attendance: 27,035

1 January 1994 24	Wimbledon	0–3	Arsenal	London
15:00 GMT			18' Campbell; 23' Parlour; 55' Wright	Stadium: Selhurst Park; Attendance: 16,584

3 January 1994 25	Arsenal	0–0	Queens Park Rangers	London
15:00 GMT				Stadium: Highbury; Attendance: 34,935

15 January 1994 26	Manchester City	0–0	Arsenal	Manchester
15:00 GMT				Stadium: Maine Road; Attendance: 25,642

22 January 1994 27	Arsenal	1–1	Oldham Athletic	London
15:00 GMT	Wright 45' (pen.)	Report	4' Sharp	Stadium: Highbury; Attendance: 26,524

13 February 1994 28	Norwich City	1–1	Arsenal	Norwich
17:00 GMT	Ekoku 57'		33' Campbell	Stadium: Carrow Road; Attendance: 17,667

19 February 1994 29	Everton	1–1	Arsenal	Liverpool
15:00 GMT	Cottee 81'		56' Merson	Stadium: Goodison Park; Attendance: 19,891

26 February 1994 30	Arsenal	1–0	Blackburn Rovers	London
15:00 GMT	Merson 73'			Stadium: Highbury; Attendance: 35,030

5 March 1994 31	Ipswich Town	1–5	Arsenal	Ipswich
15:00 GMT	Dixon 70' (o.g.)	Report	18', 40' (pen.), 86' Wright; 24' (o.g.) Youds; 52' Parlour	Stadium: Portman Road; Attendance: 18,656

19 March 1994 32	Southampton	0–4	Arsenal	Southampton
15:00 GMT		Report	18', 30', 68' (pen.) Wright; 84' Campbell	Stadium: The Dell; Attendance: 16,790

22 March 1994 33	Arsenal	2–2	Manchester United	London
19:45 GMT	Pallister 36' (o.g.); Merson 78'		10', 53' Sharpe	Stadium: Highbury; Attendance: 36,203

26 March 1994 34	Arsenal	1–0	Liverpool	London
15:00 GMT	Merson 47'			Stadium: Highbury; Attendance: 35,556

2 April 1994 35	Arsenal	1–1	Swindon Town	London
15:00 BST	Smith 4'		29' Bodin	Stadium: Highbury; Attendance: 31,634

4 April 1994 36	Sheffield United	1–1	Arsenal	Sheffield
15:00 BST	Rogers 54'		69' Campbell	Stadium: Bramall Lane; Attendance: 20,019

16 April 1994 37	Arsenal	1–0	Chelsea	London
15:00 BST	Wright 72'			Stadium: Highbury; Attendance: 34,314

19 April 1994 38	Arsenal	1–1	Wimbledon	London
19:45 BST	Bould 51'		37' Earle	Stadium: Highbury; Attendance: 21,292

23 April 1994 39	Aston Villa	1–2	Arsenal	Birmingham
15:00 BST	Houghton 57'	Report	30' (pen.), 90' Wright	Stadium: Villa Park; Attendance: 31,580

27 April 1994 40	Queens Park Rangers	1–1	Arsenal	London
19:45 BST	Penrice 3'		46' Merson	Stadium: Loftus Road; Attendance: 11,442

30 April 1994 41	Arsenal	0–2	West Ham United	London
15:00 BST			77' Morley; 88' Allen	Stadium: Highbury; Attendance: 33,701

7 May 1994 42	Newcastle United	2–0	Arsenal	Newcastle upon Tyne
15:00 BST	Cole 46'; Beardsley 66'			Stadium: St James' Park; Attendance: 32,216

=== European Cup Winners' Cup ===
It all began on a wet night in Odense. Tony Adams was suspended and Arsenal's Cup Winners' Cup hopes nearly died before they’d started. The Danes scored first then they missed a penalty. Arsenal pulled themselves together and Ian Wright equalised. Paul Merson broke away to hit the winner.

Kim Brinks' team made it difficult for The Gunners in the second leg. They even equalised Kevin Campbell's header. Arsenal's relief at hearing the final whistle was obvious. In those final moments several players and thousands of fans had relived the horror of the European Cup defeat by Benfica two seasons earlier. But Arsenal eased through to the second round.

Ian Wright tore Standard Liège apart at Highbury. Merson scored a brilliant free-kick. The Standard manager, Arie Haan, was sacked a few days later. So was his replacement, Rene van der Eycken, after Arsenal slaughtered Standard 7-0 in Liège.

Torino in the quarter-final posed some tougher questions. George Graham won the tactical battle in Turin, stationing David Hillier in front of Adams and Steve Bould to stop Enzo Francescoli breaking from midfield. Arsenal created most of the chances. At Highbury Paul Davis' perfectly flighted 66th minute free kick found Adams at the far post, and Adams headed the only goal of the game.

French League leaders Paris Saint-Germain were shocked when the Gunners took command at the Parc des Princes. The goalkeeper Bernard Lama was PSG's hero. Wright beat him once to head Arsenal in front. And PSG punished rare slackness on the Gunners near post at a corner, when David Ginola sneaked in to head the equaliser. Valdo, the Brazilian buzzed in midfield at Highbury. Adams was remarkable; organising, calming, dashing in with fast ditch tackles. The French threatened, but Seaman was rarely troubled. Campbells sixth minute header from Lee Dixon's cross proved decisive.

Typically, Arsenal won their first European trophy since 1970, the hard way: with Ian Wright suspended; John Jensen, Martin Keown and David Hillier injured. There were times when Arsenal rode their luck. Steve Bould had to launch a last ditch tackle on Faustino Asprilla in the opening seconds. Tomas Brolin hit the upright post in the 14th minute. Five minutes later Arsenal made the vital break through with a goal worthy of winning a final. Alan Smith pouncing on Lorenzo Minottis misdirected clearance then cracking a left footed 20 yarder past Luca Bucci, off a post. It was a great night for Smith, he's never played better than he did in Copenhagen, held the ball up tirelessly up front and frustrated Parma. It was a great night for George Graham, enjoying European success as a manager to add to his Fair Cup winners medal 24 years ago. Steve Bould won the Man of the Match plaudits and, given their injury problems, it had been a remarkable game for the Gunners. Nevio Scala, the Parma manager, also praised Arsenal: "Tactically and technically we did not function because Arsenal were a better team."

First round

15 September 1993 1st Leg	Odense BK	1–2	Arsenal	Odense
	Keown 18' (o.g.)		35' Wright; 68' Merson	Stadium: Fionia Park; Attendance: 9,580

29 September 1993 2nd Leg	Arsenal	1–1 (3–2 agg.)	Odense BK	London
	Campbell 52'		86' Nielsen	Stadium: Highbury; Attendance: 25,689

Second round

20 October 1993 1st Leg	Arsenal	3–0	Standard Liège	London
	Wright 39', 63'; Merson 50'			Stadium: Highbury; Attendance: 25,258

3 November 1993 2nd Leg	Standard Liège	0-7 (0–10 agg.)	Arsenal	Liège
			Smith 2'; Selley 20'; Adams 36'; Campbell 41', 79'; Merson 73'; McGoldrick 81'	Stadium: Stade Maurice Dufrasne; Attendance: 15,000

Quarter-finals

2 March 1994 1st Leg	Torino	0–0	Arsenal	Turin
				Stadium: Stadio delle Alpi; Attendance: 32,480

15 March 1994 2nd Leg	Arsenal	1–0 (1–0 agg.)	Torino	London
	Adams 68'			Stadium: Highbury; Attendance: 34,678

Semi-finals

29 March 1994 1st Leg	Paris Saint-Germain	1–1	Arsenal	Paris
	Ginola 49'		35' Wright	Stadium: Parc des Princes; Attendance: 46,000

12 April 1994 2nd Leg	Arsenal	1–0 (2–1 agg.)	Paris Saint-Germain	London
	Campbell 7'			Stadium: Highbury; Attendance: 34,212

Final

4 May 1994	Arsenal	1–0	Parma	Copenhagen
20:15 CEST	Smith 20'			Stadium: Parken Stadium; Attendance: 33,765; Referee: Václav Krondl (Czech Republic)

=== FA Cup ===
Arsenal visited George Grahams old club Millwall in the first round. Tony Adams won the game when he headed home a corner as Paul Merson challenged Kasey Keller.

Bolton had knocked out Liverpool in 1993 and beat Everton in the 1994 third round replay. Jason McAteer escaped from man-marking Martin Keown who collided with Steve Bould to fire Wanderers ahead. That brought Arsenal to life. Early in the second half, Ian Wright levelled from Mersons shot, and Adams headed a second from a free-kick. Bolton however stepped up another gear. Under continual pressure the Gunners finally cracked, when Owen Coyle netted Boltons equaliser, only five minutes from the final whistle.

The replay at Highbury took a turn after 20 minutes. Phil Brown lofted an overhead kick into the Arsenal box. The Gunners defence pressed out and John McGinlay ran on to head past David Seamans outstretched hand. Alan Smith levelled the scores, after Ian Wright had challenged Aidan Davison for Lee Dixons throw in. The game thundered into extra-time and after 103 minutes Nigel Winterburn stubbed a back pass. Coyles shot hit the post and McAteer buried the rebound. Five minutes from the end substitute striker Andy Walker was put clear and drove home the third to end any doubts about the outcome. Bruce Riochs side ended Arsenals hopes of retaining the trophy.

10 January 1994 R3	Millwall	0–1	Arsenal	London
				Stadium: The Den

31 January 1994 R4	Bolton Wanderers	2–2	Arsenal	Bolton
				Stadium: Burden Park

9 February 1994 R4 Replay	Arsenal	1–3	Bolton Wanderers	London
				Stadium: Highbury

=== League Cup ===
21 September 1993 R2 1st Leg	Huddersfield Town	0–5	Arsenal	Huddersfield
				Stadium: Leeds Road, Huddersfield

5 October 1993 R2 2nd Leg	Arsenal	1–1 (6–1 agg.)	Huddersfield Town	London
				Stadium: Highbury

26 October 1993 R3	Arsenal	1–1	Norwich City	London
				Stadium: Highbury

10 November 1993 R3 Replay	Norwich City	0–3	Arsenal	Norwich
				Stadium: Carrow Road

30 November 1993 R4	Arsenal	0–1	Aston Villa	London
				Stadium: Highbury

=== FA Charity Shield ===
7 August 1993	Arsenal	1–1 (4–5 p)	Manchester United	Wembley Stadium, London
12:30 BST	Wright 40'		Hughes 8'	Attendance: 66,519; Referee: Gerald Ashby (Worcestershire)
	Penalties
	Winterburn (penalty scored); Jensen (penalty scored); Campbell (penalty scored); Merson (penalty scored); Wright (penalty missed); Seaman (penalty missed)		(penalty scored) Ince; (penalty scored) Bruce; (penalty missed) Irwin; (penalty scored) Keane; (penalty scored) Cantona; (penalty scored) Robson

== First-team squad ==
Squad at end of season

Note: Flags indicate national team as defined under FIFA eligibility rules; some limited exceptions apply. Players may hold more than one non-FIFA nationality.

No.	Pos.	Nation	Player
1	GK	ENG	David Seaman
2	DF	ENG	Lee Dixon
3	DF	ENG	Nigel Winterburn
4	MF	ENG	Paul Davis
5	DF	ENG	Andy Linighan
6	DF	ENG	Tony Adams
7	FW	ENG	Kevin Campbell
8	FW	ENG	Ian Wright
9	FW	ENG	Alan Smith
10	MF	ENG	Paul Merson
11	MF	IRL	Eddie McGoldrick

No.	Pos.	Nation	Player
12	DF	ENG	Steve Bould
13	GK	ENG	Alan Miller
14	DF	ENG	Martin Keown
17	MF	DEN	John Jensen
18	MF	ENG	David Hillier
21	DF	NIR	Steve Morrow
22	MF	ENG	Ian Selley
23	MF	ENG	Ray Parlour
24	MF	ENG	Mark Flatts
27	FW	SCO	Paul Dickov

=== Left club during season ===
Note: Flags indicate national team as defined under FIFA eligibility rules; some limited exceptions apply. Players may hold more than one non-FIFA nationality.

No.	Pos.	Nation	Player
15	MF	SWE	Anders Limpar (to Everton)
25	MF	ENG	Neil Heaney (to Southampton)

== Reserve squad ==
Note: Flags indicate national team as defined under FIFA eligibility rules; some limited exceptions apply. Players may hold more than one non-FIFA nationality.

No.	Pos.	Nation	Player
19	MF	ENG	Jimmy Carter
20	DF	NOR	Pal Lydersen

No.	Pos.	Nation	Player
26	GK	SCO	James Will
