= 1992–93 Arsenal F.C. season =

English football club season

Arsenal
1992–93 season
- Chairman: Peter Hill-Wood
- Manager: George Graham
- Stadium: Highbury
- FA Premier League: 10th
- FA Cup: Winners
- League Cup: Winners
- Top goalscorer: League: Ian Wright (15); All: Ian Wright (30)
- Highest home attendance: 29,739 vs. Manchester United (28 November 1992)
- Lowest home attendance: 18,253 vs. Wimbledon (10 February 1993)
- Average home league attendance: 24,403
Home colours	Away colours

The 1992–93 season was Arsenal Football Club's 67th consecutive season in the top flight of English football. Arsenal finished tenth in the Premier League, but won the FA Cup and League Cup. Ian Wright was Arsenal's top scorer.

== Season summary ==
Fans favourite David Rocastle had been sold to Leeds for £2 million, however George Graham had signed one of Denmark's European championship-winning heroes John Jensen, from Brøndby for £1.1 million. In February 1993 Graham paid Everton £2 million to re-sign Martin Keown, the England centre back who had left Highbury for Aston Villa shortly after Graham's arrival in 1986. Though he was cup-tied and couldn't play in the cup games.

Arsenal went from being a title-chasing team to a formidable cup-team, and with a more pragmatic, game-by-game approach, finished the 1992/93 season with both domestic cups. Arsenal topped the table in early November, but it did not last as it was a losing league season, in which they finished tenth, didn’t average a goal a game, and played dire football, especially at home, yet ended the season in historic glory. The European qualification would prove important, ensuring Arsenal qualified for the European Cup Winners Cup, and were thereby positioned for even more success.

The end of the season saw the departure of long-serving Irish defender David O'Leary, who, to date, holds the record for the most appearances, 722, for Arsenal.

Arsenal Stadium looked like a building site throughout the season. The stadium had to be rebuilt to comply with the Taylor Report's safety recommendations. The symbol of Highbury's rebuilding was a mural that covered the old North Bank end. The North Bank terrace had been demolished to make way for a new all-seat stand, and the mural was created to hide the construction site. But in front of the mural, they took all three points only eight times and lost seven of their 21 home games. The mural received criticism and became a vehicle for political point-scoring when it came to light that none of its faces was black, an oversight quickly rectified. With ground capacity temporarily reduced to 29,000, home games were virtually sold out every week.

== Premier League ==
Arsenal hosted Norwich City at Highbury on the opening weekend of the season.

Arsenal recorded their first league win of the campaign against Liverpool at Anfield; midfielder Ray Parlour created both of the team's goals. This was followed by a 2–0 win at home to Oldham Athletic, where the attendance of 20,796 was Highbury's lowest in over four years, as Highbury's capacity was restricted while the North Bank was being rebuilt.

September was a disappointing month for the Gunners, who won just one out of five league games. But their 1–0 home win over Manchester City on 28 September signaled the start of a six-match winning run which propelled them to the top of the table on 7 November. However, they gained just three points from their next eight games, which included a four-match run of defeats and didn't include a single win, which left Arsenal's title hopes looking dead by the turn of 1993. However, they were still in the Football League Cup, and now had the FA Cup to play for.

=== Matches ===
15 August 1992 1	Arsenal	2 – 4	Norwich City	London
15:00 BST	Bould 28'; Campbell 39'		69', 84' Robins; 72' Phillips; 82' Fox	Stadium: Highbury; Attendance: 24,030

18 August 1992 2	Blackburn Rovers	1 – 0	Arsenal	Blackburn
19:45 BST	Shearer 85'			Stadium: Ewood Park; Attendance: 16,454

23 August 1992 3	Liverpool	0 – 2	Arsenal	Liverpool
16:00 BST			53' Limpar; 80' Wright	Stadium: Anfield; Attendance: 34,961

26 August 1992 4	Arsenal	2 – 0	Oldham Athletic	London
19:45 BST	Winterburn 25'; Wright 31'			Stadium: Highbury; Attendance: 20,796

29 August 1992 5	Arsenal	2 – 1	Sheffield Wednesday	London
15:00 BST	Parlour 8'; Merson 27'		33' Hirst	Stadium: Highbury; Attendance: 23,389; Referee: Paul Durkin

2 September 1992 6	Queens Park Rangers	0 – 0	Arsenal	London
19:45 BST				Stadium: Loftus Road; Attendance: 20,868

5 September 1992 7	Wimbledon	3 – 2	Arsenal	London
15:00 BST	Sanchez 39'; Fashanu 81'; Earle 87'		34', 82' Wright	Stadium: Selhurst Park; Attendance: 12,906; Referee: Keith Burge

12 September 1992 8	Arsenal	0 – 1	Blackburn Rovers	London
15:00 BST			71' Newell	Stadium: Highbury; Attendance: 28,643; Referee: Mike Reed

19 September 1992 9	Sheffield United	1 – 1	Arsenal	Sheffield
15:00 BST	Whitehouse 48'		85' Wright	Stadium: Bramall Lane; Attendance: 19,105

28 September 1992 10	Arsenal	1 – 0	Manchester City	London
19:45 BST	Wright 19'			Stadium: Highbury; Attendance: 21,504

3 October 1992 11	Arsenal	2 – 1	Chelsea	London
15:00 BST	Merson 10'; Wright 85'		78' Wise	Stadium: Highbury; Attendance: 27,780

17 October 1992 12	Nottingham Forest	0 – 1	Arsenal	Nottingham
15:00 BST			37' Smith	Stadium: City Ground; Attendance: 24,862

24 October 1992 13	Arsenal	2 – 0	Everton	London
15:00 BST	Wright 5'; Limpar 58'			Stadium: Highbury; Attendance: 28,052

2 November 1992 14	Crystal Palace	1 – 2	Arsenal	London
20:00 GMT	McGoldrick 69'		5' Merson; 73' Wright	Stadium: Selhurst Park; Attendance: 20,287

7 November 1992 15	Arsenal	3 – 0	Coventry City	London
15:00 GMT	Smith 8'; Wright 30'; Campbell 45'			Stadium: Highbury; Attendance: 27,693

21 November 1992 16	Leeds United	3 – 0	Arsenal	Leeds
15:00 GMT	Fairclough 51'; Chapman 56'; McAllister 87'			Stadium: Elland Road; Attendance: 30,516

28 November 1992 17	Arsenal	0 – 1	Manchester United	London
15:00 GMT			27' Hughes	Stadium: Highbury; Attendance: 29,739

5 December 1992 18	Southampton	2 – 0	Arsenal	Southampton
15:00 GMT	Maddison 16'; Dowie 53'			Stadium: The Dell; Attendance: 17,286

12 December 1992 19	Tottenham Hotspur	1 – 0	Arsenal	London
15:00 GMT	Allen 21'			Stadium: White Hart Lane; Attendance: 33,707

19 December 1992 20	Arsenal	1 – 1	Middlesbrough	London
15:00 GMT	Wright 81'		34' Wilkinson	Stadium: Highbury; Attendance: 23,197; Referee: Stephen Lodge

26 December 1992 21	Arsenal	0 – 0	Ipswich Town	London
12:00 GMT				Stadium: Highbury; Attendance: 26,198

28 December 1992 22	Aston Villa	1 – 0	Arsenal	Birmingham
19:30 GMT	Saunders 45'			Stadium: Villa Park; Attendance: 35,170; Referee: Martin Bodenham

9 January 1993 23	Arsenal	1 – 1	Sheffield United	London
15:00 GMT	Hillier 43'		87' Littlejohn	Stadium: Highbury; Attendance: 23,818; Referee: Gerald Ashby

16 January 1993 24	Manchester City	0 – 1	Arsenal	Manchester
15:00 GMT			79' Merson	Stadium: Maine Road; Attendance: 25,041; Referee: Keith Burge

31 January 1993 25	Arsenal	0 – 1	Liverpool	London
16:00 GMT			59' Barnes	Stadium: Highbury; Attendance: 27,580

10 February 1993 26	Arsenal	0 – 1	Wimbledon	London
19:45 GMT			19' Holdsworth	Stadium: Highbury; Attendance: 18,253

20 February 1993 27	Oldham Athletic	0 – 1	Arsenal	Oldham
15:00 GMT			50' Linighan	Stadium: Boundary Park; Attendance: 12,311

24 February 1993 28	Arsenal	0 – 0	Leeds United	London
19:45 GMT				Stadium: Highbury; Attendance: 21,061

1 March 1993 29	Chelsea	1 – 0	Arsenal	London
19:45 GMT	Stuart 81'			Stadium: Stamford Bridge; Attendance: 17,725

3 March 1993 30	Norwich City	1 – 1	Arsenal	Norwich
19:45 GMT	Fox 36'		82' Wright	Stadium: Carrow Road; Attendance: 19,000

13 March 1993 31	Coventry City	0 – 2	Arsenal	Coventry
15:00 GMT			28' Campbell; 29' Wright	Stadium: Highfield Road; Attendance: 15,437

20 March 1993 32	Arsenal	4 – 3	Southampton	London
15:00 GMT	Linighan 15'; Merson 16'; Carter 20', 79'		4' Dowie; 30' Adams; 50' Le Tissier	Stadium: Highbury; Attendance: 24,149

24 March 1993 33	Manchester United	0 – 0	Arsenal	Manchester
20:00 GMT				Stadium: Old Trafford; Attendance: 37,301

6 April 1993 34	Middlesbrough	1 – 0	Arsenal	Middlesbrough
19:45 BST	Hendrie 32'			Stadium: Ayresome Park; Attendance: 12,726

10 April 1993 35	Ipswich	1 – 2	Arsenal	Ipswich
15:00 BST	Wark 27'		2' Smith; 87' Merson	Stadium: Portman Road; Attendance: 20,358

12 April 1993 36	Arsenal	0 – 1	Aston Villa	London
15:00 BST			68' Daley	Stadium: Highbury; Attendance: 27,125; Referee: Gerald Ashby

21 April 1993 37	Arsenal	1 – 1	Nottingham Forest	London
19:45 BST	Wright 67'		90' Keane	Stadium: Highbury; Attendance: 19,024; Referee: Martin Bodenham

1 May 1993 38	Everton	0 – 0	Arsenal	Liverpool
15:00 BST				Stadium: Goodison Park; Attendance: 19,044

4 May 1993 39	Arsenal	0 – 0	Queens Park Rangers	London
19:45 BST				Stadium: Highbury; Attendance: 18,817

6 May 1993 40	Sheffield Wednesday	1 – 0	Arsenal	Sheffield
19:45 BST	Bright 19'			Stadium: Hillsborough; Attendance: 23,645

8 May 1993 41	Arsenal	3 – 0	Crystal Palace	London
15:00 BST	Wright 9'; Dickov 82'; Campbell 89'			Stadium: Highbury; Attendance: 25,225; Referee: Keith Burge

11 May 1993 42	Arsenal	1 – 3	Tottenham Hotspur	London
19:45 BST	Dickov 52'		39' Sheringham; 46', 78' Hendry	Stadium: Highbury; Attendance: 26,393

=== Classification ===
Pos	Team	Pld	W	D	L	GF	GA	GD	Pts	Qualification or relegation
8	Tottenham Hotspur	42	16	11	15	60	66	−6	59	
9	Manchester City	42	15	12	15	56	51	+5	57	
10	Arsenal	42	15	11	16	40	38	+2	56	Qualification for the Cup Winners' Cup first round (Note: Arsenal qualified by winning the FA Cup and therefore did not take up their UEFA Cup spot for winning the League Cup, which reverted to the league.)
11	Chelsea	42	14	14	14	51	54	−3	56	
12	Wimbledon	42	14	12	16	56	55	+1	54	

Source: Premier League
Rules for classification: 1) points; 2) goal difference; 3) number of goals scored.

==== Results summary ====
Overall								Home						Away					
Pld	W	D	L	GF	GA	GD	Pts	W	D	L	GF	GA	GD	W	D	L	GF	GA	GD
42	15	11	16	40	38	+2	56	8	6	7	25	20	+5	7	5	9	15	18	−3

==== Results by round ====
Round	1	2	3	4	5	6	7	8	9	10	11	12	13	14	15	16	17	18	19	20	21	22	23	24	25	26	27	28	29	30	31	32	33	34	35	36	37	38	39	40	41	42
Ground	H	A	A	H	H	A	A	H	A	H	H	A	H	A	H	A	H	A	A	H	H	A	H	A	A	H	A	H	A	H	A	H	A	A	A	H	H	A	H	A	H	H
Result	L	L	W	W	W	D	L	L	D	W	W	W	W	W	W	L	L	L	L	D	D	L	D	W	L	L	W	D	L	D	W	W	D	L	W	L	D	D	D	L	W	L
Position	22	22	14	9	5	5	7	9	13	9	7	5	4	3	1	2	3	6	8	6	8	9	9	7	11	12	11	11	12	11	12	9	9	11	10	11	12	12	12	12	9	10

A = Away; H = Home; W = Win; D = Draw; L = Loss

== Football League Cup ==
The Football League Cup is a cup competition open to clubs in the Premier League and Football League. Like the FA Cup it is played on a knockout basis, with the exception of the second round and semi-finals, which are contested over a two-legged tie.

Arsenal entered the competition in the second round, as one of the 22 teams from the Premier League. They were drawn against Millwall; the first leg took place at Highbury on 22 September 1992. In the match Campbell scored in the 78th minute to cancel out Millwall's lead early in the second half. The second leg at The Den was much the same, with both teams playing out for a 1–1 draw. As there were no further goals the match was decided by a penalty shoot-out, which Arsenal won 3–1.

Next up were Derby. Arsenal started with Pål Lydersen and Steve Morrow in place of the injured Lee Dixon and Nigel Winterburn. Derby’s Paul Simpson converted a 70th minute penalty and Kevin Campbell came to the rescue once more, collecting Anders Limpars pass to force a replay, five weeks later. Campbell and Ian Wright wrapped that game up early, despite Mark Pembridge's 44th minute penalty.

At the postponed fourth round tie at Scarborough the conditions were far from ideal because of wintry weather the pitch was soaked. Fog enveloped the ground throughout the first half, but Arsenal kept their nerve and Winterburn drilled the only goal.

That brought Nottingham Forest to Highbury. The Gunners upped the tempo after a stuttering first half. Wright’s pace terrified the Forest defence and he claimed both goals.

Wright hit the opener, from the penalty spot, in the semi-final first leg against his old club, Crystal Palace. Alan Smith lashed the second after Nigel Martyn had blocked Wright. Simon Osborn replied from the spot in the second half, but Smith prodded home Arsenal’s third to make the second leg at Highbury a formality. Andy Linighan's early header and Wright’s goal made it 5-1 on aggregate.

Without the injured Smith, the suspended Dixon and the cup-tied Keown Arsenal were forced to shuffle their pack. Paul Davis was recalled, to unanimous amazement, after just one comeback match in the reserves following hamstring trouble. And Northern Ireland defender Morrow was pressed into service beside Davis in midfield, where he was to command centre stage. April 18, 1993 will be remembered as Steve Morrow’s final.

The Owls snatched an early lead through American John Harkes. Paul Merson inspired Arsenal’s comeback with a stunning 25-yarder that left Chris Woods stranded. Morrow’s magic moment arrived midway through the second half. Carlton Palmer miscued his clearance and in raced the Northern Ireland international, pouncing to crash his first goal for the Gunners. Then to the drama after the final whistle. Morrow was celebrating with Adams, when he tumbled to the turf. Suddenly the players around him realised this was serious. Morrow was wheeled away on a stretcher, an oxygen mask strapped to his face. He was diagnosed as having a broken arm and the operation was performed that night. The injury kept Morrow out for the rest of the season, and took the shine off the Gunners’ celebrations. Tony Adams, understandably, was too upset to speak to the press.

22 September 1992 Second round	Arsenal	1 – 1	Millwall	London
	Campbell 78'		52' Roberts	Stadium: Highbury; Attendance: 20,940

7 October 1992 Second round	Millwall	1 – 1 (1–3 p)	Arsenal	London
	Dixon 25' (o.g.)		17' Campbell	Stadium: The Den; Attendance: 18,500

28 October 1992 Third round	Derby County	1 – 1	Arsenal	Derby
	Simpson 25' (pen.)		76' Campbell	Stadium: Baseball Ground; Attendance: 22,208

1 December 1992 Third round replay	Arsenal	2 – 1	Derby County	London
	Wright 7'; Campbell 14'		44' (pen.) Pembridge	Stadium: Highbury; Attendance: 24,587

6 January 1993 Fourth round	Scarborough	0 – 1	Arsenal	Scarborough
			51' Winterburn	Stadium: McCain Stadium; Attendance: 6,261

12 January 1993 Fifth round	Arsenal	2 – 0	Nottingham Forest	London
	Wright 55', 78'			Stadium: Highbury; Attendance: 25,600

7 February 1993 Semi-finals	Crystal Palace	1 – 3	Arsenal	London
	Osborn 54'		Wright 8' (pen.); Smith 22', 66'	Stadium: Selhurst Park; Attendance: 26,508

10 March 1993 Semi-finals	Arsenal	2 – 0	Crystal Palace	London
	Linighan 6'; Wright 45'			Stadium: Highbury; Attendance: 28,584

18 April 1993 Final	Arsenal	2 – 1	Sheffield Wednesday	London
	Merson 20'; Morrow 68'		Harkes 8'	Stadium: Wembley Stadium; Attendance: 74,007

== FA Cup ==
When Arsenal won the double in 1971, they began their FA Cup procession at Yeovil. Now TV and press gathered, sensing an upset to make national headlines. "Sorry to disappoint you, lads", grinned George Graham after Ian Wright's hattrick had demolished the non-league Yeovil Town on their own patch at The Huish Park.

The fourth round matched Arsenal with Leeds in a re-run of the marathon 1991 tie. Leeds led 2-0 at half time. The Gunners came out blazing in the second half. Ray Parlour quickly pulled one back. Then, with nine minutes left, Paul Merson unleashed a 25-yarder that flashed past keeper John Lukic. So to a replay at Elland Road. Injury-hit Arsenal arrived with youngsters Ian Selley, Steve Morrow and Parlour in midfield. David Seaman made a breathtaking early save from Lee Chapman. Yet the longer the game went on, the more comfortable the battling Gunners seemed. Leeds were stunned when Ian Wright crossed from the left and Alan Smith hooked Arsenal in front. Carl Shutt and Gary McAllister made it 2-1 for Leeds. Up popped Wright again with the minutes ticking away. Extra time and Wright cracked the third.

Two more Wright corkers, both from Ian Selley assists, saw off Nottingham Forest in the fifth round.

On to Ipswich for the quarter-final. Tony Adams hadn’t scored since March 1992. The Arsenal skipper playing with a dressing on his forehead, headed home Merson’s free-kick to equalise Chris Kiwomya's opener. John Wark floored Wright in the box, and Ian Wright stroked away the penalty. Then Phil Whelan, under pressure from Wright, nicked a back pass past Clive Baker. Boncho Genchev made it 3-2 when Arsenal failed to clear a free-kick. But sub Kevin Campbell cracked a fourth in the dying minutes.

A crowd of 76,263 packed Wembley on 4 April 1993 for the semi-final, and sweet revenge for Arsenal after Tottenham had denied them a double in 1991. Tottenham claimed a penalty when Andy Linighan challenged Darren Anderton outside the box. David Seaman was immaculate as Spurs stepped up the pressure. Erik Thorstvedt made great saves from Selley and Wright. But with 13 minutes left Adams turned the tie. Merson swung over a free-kick and Adams arrived on the far post to head the winner, leading to another Wembley clash with Sheffield Wednesday.

Two weary teams produced a tired FA Cup final. After 18 minutes, Wednesday's Mark Bright brought down Lee Dixon, Paul Davis floated the free-kick, Linighan nodded it across goal and Ian Wright stooped to nod Arsenal ahead. He played with a broken toe but maintained his remarkable goalscoring record for the season. A John Sheridan cross was nodded back by Bright, and John Harkes stooped at the far post to touch the ball into David Hirsts path. Even extra time couldn't produce a winner. It also turned out to be the very last time the FA Cup Final required a replay.

The FA Cup final replay, played on the following Thursday in torrential rain, attracted only 62.367 spectators, the lowest crowd ever for the fixture at Wembley, and the lowest FA Cup final attendance for 71 years. Arsenal dominated the first 65 minutes of a bruising confrontation. Alan Smith sent Wright racing through to beat Chris Woods after 34 minutes. It was the Wrights 56th goal in 79 matches for Arsenal. Smith flicked another effort into the side netting and Wednesday hadn’t troubled David Seaman. That all changed after 68 minutes. Chris Waddles shot deflected off Lee Dixon and Seaman was beaten. Wednesday were on a high. They could have won it a few minutes later. Extra time again and tired legs tried to conjure a winner. Penalties looked inevitable. Then Andy Linighan struck in the last minute when he met Paul Merson’s corner with a header, which Woods got two hands to, but couldn’t keep out. Also Linighan did it with a broken nose inflicted by an Elbow from Mark Bright, as well as two broken fingers. Just 18 months earlier, he had asked for a transfer because he could not gain regular first team football at Highbury. Now he will be remembered as the man who scored the latest FA Cup goal of all time.

2 January 1993 R3	Yeovil Town	1 – 3	Arsenal	Yeovil
			Wright x3	Stadium: Huish Park

25 January 1993 R4	Arsenal	2 – 2	Leeds United	London
	Merson; Parlour			Stadium: Highbury; Attendance: 26,516

3 February 1993 R4 Replay	Leeds United	2 – 3	Arsenal	Leeds
			Wright x2 Smith	Stadium: Elland Road; Attendance: 26,449

13 February 1993 R5	Arsenal	2 – 0	Nottingham Forest	London
	Wright x2			Stadium: Highbury

6 March 1993 R6	Ipswich Town	2 – 4	Arsenal	Ipswich
			Wright (p); Campbell o.g. Adams	Stadium: Portman Road; Attendance: 22,054

4 April 1993 Semi-Finals	Arsenal	1 – 0	Tottenham Hotspur	London
	Adams			Stadium: Wembley Stadium; Attendance: 76,263

15 May 1993 Final	Arsenal	1–1	Sheffield Wednesday	London
	Wright 20'		Hirst 61'	Stadium: Wembley; Attendance: 79,347

20 May 1993 Final Replay	Arsenal	2–1 (a.e.t.)	Sheffield Wednesday	London
	Wright 34'; Linighan 119'		Waddle 68'	Stadium: Wembley; Attendance: 62,267

== Squad statistics ==
Arsenal used a total of 29 players during the 1992–93 season and there were nine different goalscorers. There were also two squad members who did not make a first-team appearance in the campaign. Adams featured in 52 games and started the most games in the squad. The team scored a total of 72 goals in all competitions. The top goalscorer was Wright, with 30 goals – half of which were scored in the league.

Key

No. = Squad number

Pos = Playing position

Nat. = Nationality

Apps = Appearances

GK = Goalkeeper

DF = Defender

MF = Midfielder

FW = Forward

Numbers in parentheses denote appearances as substitute. Players with name struck through and marked † left the club during the playing season.

Pos.	Nat.	Name	League		FA Cup		League Cup		Total	
Pos.	Nat.	Name	Apps	Goals	Apps	Goals	Apps	Goals	Apps	Goals
GK	ENG	David Seaman	39	0	8	0	9	0	56	0
GK	ENG	Alan Miller	3 (1)	0	0	0	0	0	3 (1)	0
DF	ENG	Nigel Winterburn	29	1	8	0	7	1	44	2
DF	ENG	Lee Dixon	29	0	8	0	7	0	44	0
DF	ENG	Tony Adams	33 (2)	0	8	2	9	0	50 (2)	2
DF	ENG	Steve Bould	24	1	1	0	5	0	30	1
DF	ENG	Andy Linighan	19 (2)	2	7	1	4	1	30 (2)	4
DF	IRE	David O'Leary	6 (5)	0	1 (3)	0	2	0	9 (8)	0
DF	ENG	Colin Pates	2 (5)	0	0	0	0	0	2 (5)	0
DF	ENG	Martin Keown	15 (1)	0	0	0	0	0	15 (1)	0
DF	NIR	Steve Morrow	13 (3)	0	2 (2)	0	4 (1)	1	19 (6)	1
DF	NOR	Pål Lydersen	7 (1)	0	0	0	1	0	8 (1)	0
DF	SCO	Scott Marshall	2	0	0	0	0	0	2	0
DF	ENG	Gavin McGowan	(2)	0	0	0	0	0	(2)	0
MF	ENG	David Hillier	27 (3)	1	4 (1)	0	7 (1)	0	38 (5)	1
MF	SWE	Anders Limpar	12 (11)	2	2	0	4	0	18 (11)	2
MF	ENG	Paul Davis	6	0	2	0	3	0	11	0
MF	ENG	Perry Groves	(1)	0	0	0	0	0	(1)	0
MF	ENG	Ray Parlour	16 (5)	1	4	1	3 (5)	0	23 (6)	2
MF	ENG	Jimmy Carter	11 (5)	2	1	0	1 (1)	0	13 (6)	2
MF	DEN	John Jensen	29 (3)	0	4	0	3	0	36 (3)	0
MF	ENG	Ian Selley	9	0	3	0	1	0	13	0
MF	ENG	Mark Flatts	6 (4)	0	0	0	1	0	7 (4)	0
MF	ENG	Neil Heaney	3 (2)	0	0	0	0	0	3 (2)	0
MF	ENG	Paul Merson	32 (1)	6	8	1	9	1	49 (1)	8
FW	ENG	Ian Wright	30 (1)	15	7	10	8	5	45 (1)	30
FW	ENG	Kevin Campbell	32 (5)	4	4 (3)	1	5 (4)	4	41 (12)	9
FW	ENG	Alan Smith	27 (4)	3	5 (2)	1	7	2	39 (6)	6
FW	SCO	Paul Dickov	1 (2)	2	0	0	0	0	1 (2)	2

== See also ==
- 1992–93 in English football
