= Steve Bould =

English football coach (born 1962)

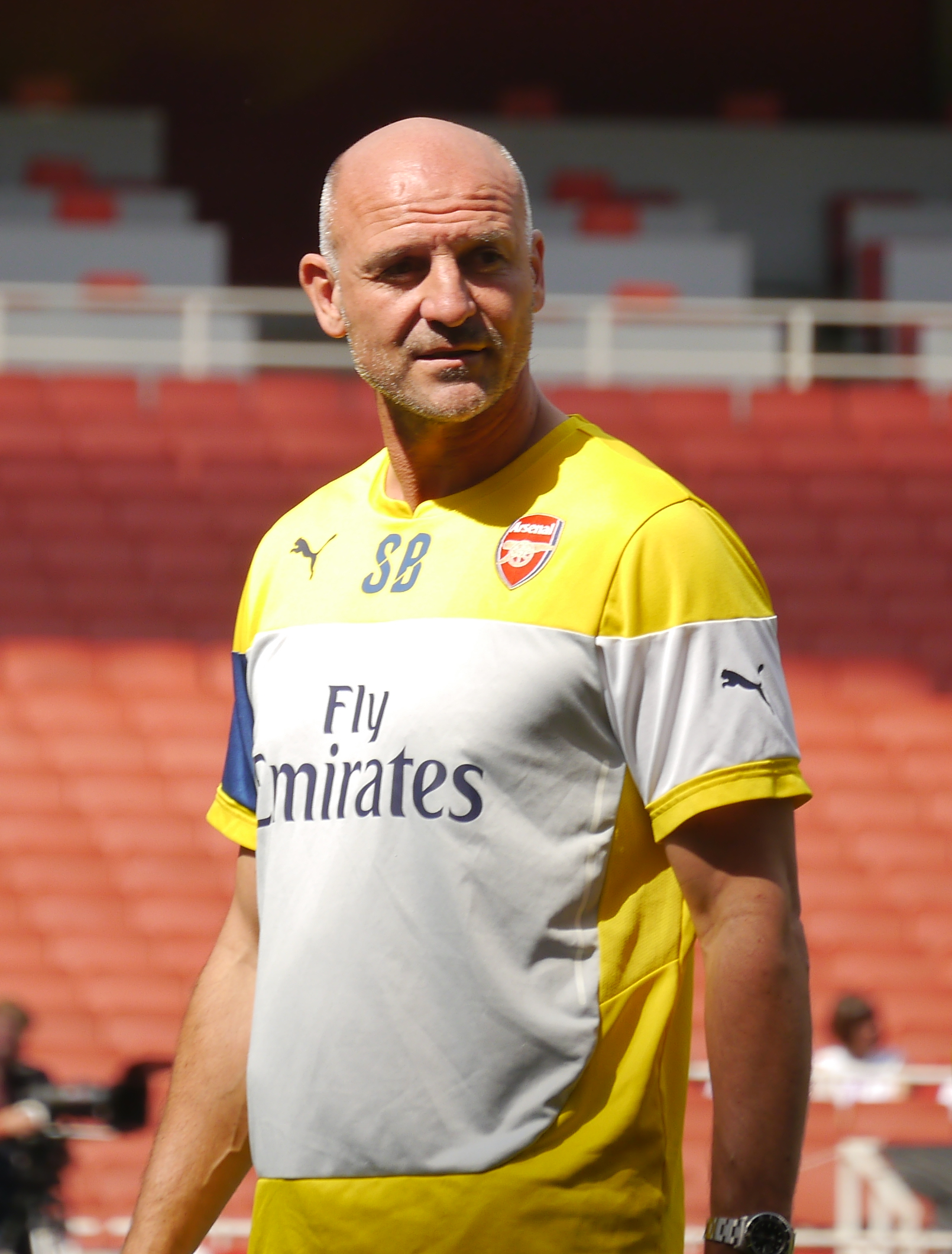
- Bould as Arsenal's assistant manager in 2014

Personal information
- Full name: Stephen Andrew Bould
- Date of birth: 16 November 1962 (age 63)
- Place of birth: Stoke-on-Trent, England
- Height: 6 ft 4 in (1.93 m)
- Position: Centre back

Team information
- Current team: Queens Park Rangers (first team coach)

Youth career
- 1978–1980: Stoke City

Senior career*
| Years | Team | Apps | (Gls) |
| 1980–1988 | Stoke City | 183 | (6) |
| 1982 | → Torquay United (loan) | 9 | (0) |
| 1988–1999 | Arsenal | 287 | (5) |
| 1999–2000 | Sunderland | 21 | (0) |
| Total | | 500 | (11) |

International career
| 1994 | England B | 1 | (1) |
| 1994 | England | 2 | (0) |

Managerial career
- 2022–2025: Lommel
- * Club domestic league appearances and goals

Stephen Andrew Bould (born 16 November 1962) is an English football coach and former professional footballer who is currently first team coach of EFL Championship club Queens Park Rangers.

As a player, he was a defender from 1980 until 2000. Bould began his football career with his hometown club Stoke City where he gained a reputation as an impressive young defender. After spending seven seasons with the Potters, and becoming one of English football's most coveted centre backs, he moved to Arsenal in 1988. At Highbury, he formed a formidable back line with Tony Adams, Nigel Winterburn and his former Stoke teammate Lee Dixon. He left the Gunners in 1999 and ended his playing career with Sunderland.

Since his playing career ended, Bould has worked at the successful Arsenal Academy as Head Youth Team Coach at Arsenal. He was promoted to assistant manager at the start of the 2012–13 season, replacing the long serving Pat Rice. He later had a spells as head coach of U23s side.

== Club career ==
=== Stoke City ===
Born in Stoke-on-Trent, Bould signed for his hometown club Stoke City as a schoolboy in 1978, turning professional in November 1980. He made his debut at right back in a 3–2 defeat away to Middlesbrough in September 1981. However, he was unable to command a regular place in the team, and was loaned out to Torquay United in October 1982 to gain first team experience, playing nine league games for Bruce Rioch's side.

Bould slowly became a regular in the Stoke side after Mick Mills switched him to centre back to replace Paul Dyson. It proved to be a shrewd move as he excelled in his new position and became a first team regular for the "Potters". A back injury that required surgery cost him appearances in 1986–87 and arguably Stoke a play-off place. By the end of the 1987–88 season it was generally acknowledged that Bould was now the best defender in Division Two. Both Arsenal and Everton made approaches for the defender. After discussions Bould chose Arsenal and a tribunal set the price at £390,000, a small fee compared to what Stoke were demanding.

=== Arsenal ===
He moved to Arsenal for a fee of £390,000 on 13 June 1988, and became part of their "famous back four" defensive line-up, with Tony Adams, Nigel Winterburn and his former Stoke teammate Lee Dixon. Bould won the First Division title twice in 1988–89 and 1990–91, playing in the club's famous 2–0 victory against Liverpool at Anfield where they won the title in the last minute of the last game of the season. He was voted player of the year by the club's fans for the 1991–92 season, though it was a less successful season for the club as defending champions, managing only a fourth-place finish in the league and suffering an early exit from the European Cup, as well as a shock first hurdle exit from the FA Cup at the hands of minnows Wrexham.

On 15 August 1992, he had the distinction of being the scorer of Arsenal's first Premier League goal on the opening day of the season at Highbury, breaking the deadlock in the 28th minute although Arsenal went on lose the match 4–2 to Norwich City.

However, injury ruled him out of the FA Cup and League Cup finals that Arsenal won in 1992–93, and his place in the team was taken by Andy Linighan who scored Arsenal's winning goal in the FA Cup final replay against Sheffield Wednesday.

After winning the Cup Winners' Cup final in 1993–94, further success eluded Arsenal and Bould for several years, and the arrival of French manager Arsène Wenger in October 1996 led some to speculate the ageing Bould would leave the club (especially as he was now often second-choice behind Martin Keown); instead, it spurred a brief revival, and Bould became an important member of the squad that won the double in 1997–98. He famously set up Tony Adams with a chipped throughball for the final goal in Arsenal's 4–0 win over Everton, the match that won them the Premier League title. Two weeks later, they won the FA Cup to complete the double.

His final season at Highbury was a disappointing one. Arsenal reached the FA Cup semi-finals, where they drew with Manchester United to force a replay. With the score at 1–1 in the final minute of the game, Arsenal were awarded a penalty. Peter Schmeichel saved from Dennis Bergkamp and a winner from Ryan Giggs in extra time ended Arsenal's defence of the trophy. A month later, they were beaten to the Premier League by Manchester United.

=== Sunderland ===
By now, age was against Bould and he moved to newly promoted Sunderland in July 1999 for a fee of £500,000. Following the departure of skipper Kevin Ball in December 1999, manager Peter Reid made him club captain and he helped them finish seventh – just missing out on a UEFA Cup place. He stayed at the Stadium of Light until arthritis contributed to his retirement in September 2000, having played only 21 Premier League games for Sunderland.

== International career ==
Despite forming part of one of the most secure top-flight defences of the late 1980s and early to mid-1990s, Bould won only two caps for England, far fewer than fellow centre half Tony Adams, and didn't make his first full international appearance until the age of 31. Both caps came under Terry Venables in Wembley friendlies against Greece (5–0) and Norway (0–0) at the end of the 1993–94 season.

== Coaching career ==
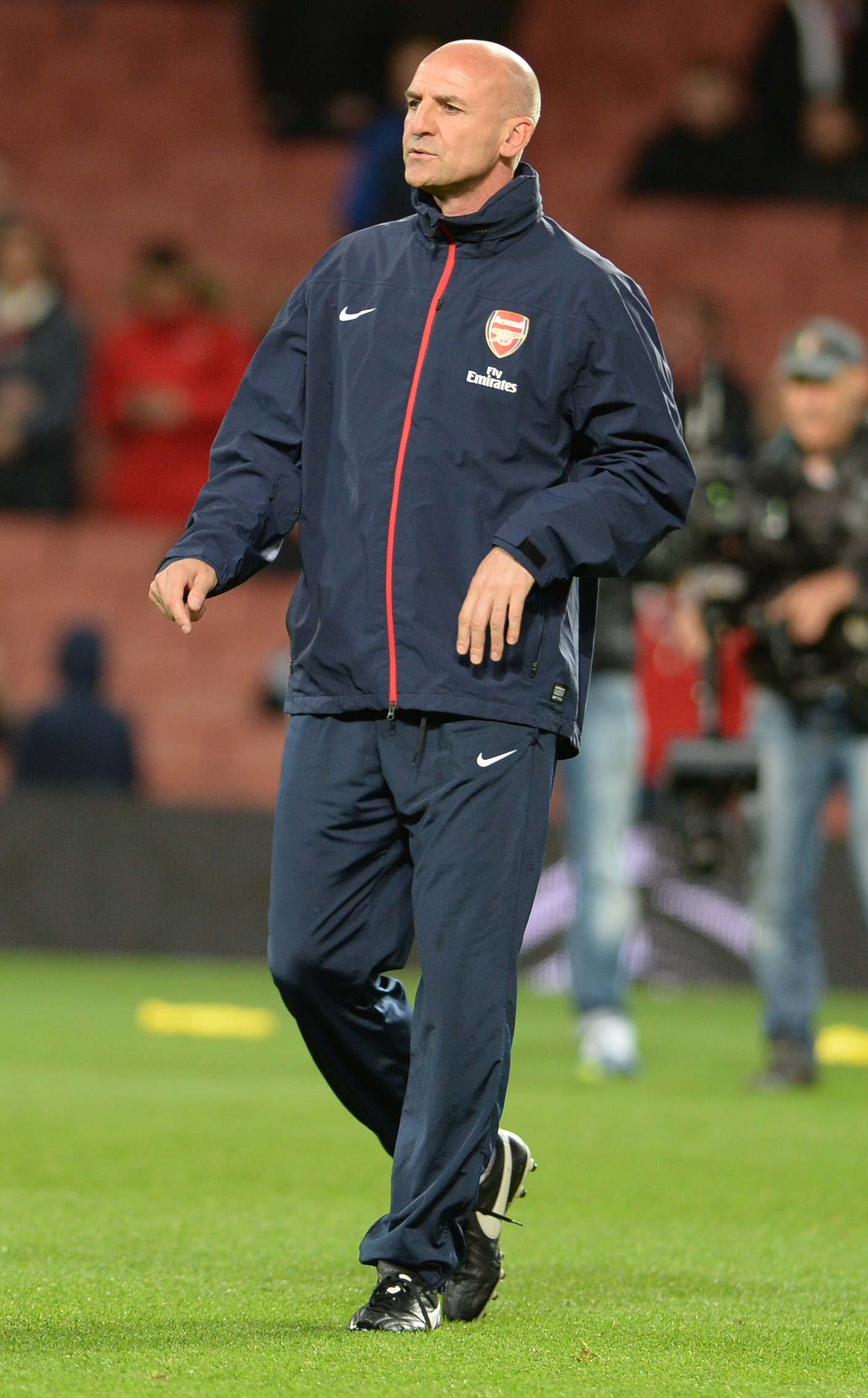
Bould in his role as Arsenal's assistant manager

After retiring, he began working towards his UEFA coaching badges and in June 2001 moved back to Arsenal and became a coach for the youth teams. He was the head coach of Arsenal's U18 Academy side, whom he led to the Premier Academy League title in 2008–2009, 2009–2010 and FA Youth Cup in 2008–2009. On 10 May 2012, it was announced that Steve Bould would become Arsenal's new assistant manager following the retirement of Pat Rice at the end of the season. On 5 June 2019, Steve Bould swapped jobs with Freddie Ljungberg to become the U23s coach in a major restructuring of Arsenal's coaching staff. In May 2021, he was sacked from his role as a coach of the U23 team. In June 2022, he was appointed as the head coach of Lommel. He resigned from Lommel on 14 January 2025, after the club gained only one point in previous five games. On 25 June 2025, Bould joined Championship side Queens Park Rangers as head of defensive coaching and first team coach.

== Career statistics ==
=== Club ===
Appearances and goals by club, season and competition
| Club | Season | League | | | FA Cup | | League Cup | | Europe | | Other | | Total | |
| Club | Season | Division | Apps | Goals | Apps | Goals | Apps | Goals | Apps | Goals | Apps | Goals | Apps | Goals |
|---|---|---|---|---|---|---|---|---|---|---|---|---|---|---|
| Stoke City | 1981–82 | First Division | 2 | 0 | 0 | 0 | 0 | 0 | — | | — | | 2 | 0 |
| Stoke City | 1982–83 | First Division | 14 | 0 | 0 | 0 | 0 | 0 | — | | — | | 14 | 0 |
| Stoke City | 1983–84 | First Division | 38 | 2 | 1 | 0 | 4 | 1 | — | | — | | 43 | 3 |
| Stoke City | 1984–85 | First Division | 38 | 3 | 2 | 0 | 2 | 0 | — | | — | | 42 | 3 |
| Stoke City | 1985–86 | Second Division | 33 | 0 | 0 | 0 | 3 | 0 | — | | 2 (Note: Appearances in Full Members' Cup) | 0 | 38 | 0 |
| Stoke City | 1986–87 | Second Division | 28 | 1 | 5 | 0 | 2 | 0 | — | | 1 | 0 | 36 | 1 |
| Stoke City | 1987–88 | Second Division | 30 | 0 | 2 | 0 | 2 | 0 | — | | 2 | 0 | 36 | 0 |
| Stoke City | Total | | 183 | 6 | 10 | 0 | 13 | 1 | — | | 5 | 0 | 211 | 7 |
| Torquay United (loan) | 1981–82 | Fourth Division | 9 | 0 | 2 | 0 | 0 | 0 | — | | — | | 11 | 0 |
| Arsenal | 1988–89 | First Division | 30 | 2 | 1 | 0 | 5 | 0 | — | | 1 (Note: Appearance in Football League Centenary Trophy) | 0 | 37 | 2 |
| Arsenal | 1989–90 | First Division | 19 | 0 | 3 | 0 | 0 | 0 | — | | — | | 22 | 0 |
| Arsenal | 1990–91 | First Division | 38 | 0 | 8 | 0 | 4 | 0 | — | | — | | 50 | 0 |
| Arsenal | 1991–92 | First Division | 25 | 1 | 0 | 0 | 0 | 0 | 1 (Note: Appearance in European Cup) | 0 | — | | 26 | 1 |
| Arsenal | 1992–93 | Premier League | 24 | 1 | 1 | 0 | 5 | 0 | — | | — | | 30 | 1 |
| Arsenal | 1993–94 | Premier League | 25 | 1 | 3 | 0 | 3 | 0 | 6 (Note: Appearances in European Cup Winners' Cup) | 0 | — | | 37 | 1 |
| Arsenal | 1994–95 | Premier League | 31 | 0 | 1 | 0 | 5 | 0 | 6 (Note: Appearances in UEFA Cup Winners' Cup) | 2 | 2 (Note: Appearances in European Super Cup) | 0 | 45 | 2 |
| Arsenal | 1995–96 | Premier League | 19 | 0 | 0 | 0 | 5 | 1 | — | | — | | 24 | 1 |
| Arsenal | 1996–97 | Premier League | 33 | 0 | 3 | 0 | 3 | 0 | 2 (Note: Appearances in UEFA Cup) | 0 | — | | 41 | 0 |
| Arsenal | 1997–98 | Premier League | 24 | 0 | 5 | 0 | 3 | 0 | 2 | 0 | — | | 34 | 0 |
| Arsenal | 1998–99 | Premier League | 19 | 0 | 4 | 0 | 0 | 0 | 3 (Note: Appearances in UEFA Champions League) | 0 | 1 (Note: Appearance in FA Charity Shield) | 0 | 27 | 0 |
| Arsenal | Total | | 287 | 5 | 29 | 0 | 33 | 1 | 20 | 2 | 4 | 0 | 373 | 8 |
| Sunderland | 1999–2000 | Premier League | 20 | 0 | 2 | 0 | 0 | 0 | — | | — | | 22 | 0 |
| Sunderland | 2000–01 | Premier League | 1 | 0 | 0 | 0 | 0 | 0 | — | | — | | 1 | 0 |
| Sunderland | Total | | 21 | 0 | 2 | 0 | 0 | 0 | — | | — | | 23 | 0 |
| Career total | | | 500 | 11 | 43 | 0 | 46 | 2 | 20 | 2 | 9 | 0 | 618 | 15 |

=== International ===
| National team | Year | Apps | Goals |
|---|---|---|---|
| England | 1994 | 2 | 0 |
| Total | | 2 | 0 |

=== Managerial ===
As of 16 March 2024

Managerial record by team and tenure
| Team | Nat | From | To | Record | | | | | | | |
| Team | Nat | From | To | G | W | D | L | GF | GA | GD | Win % |
|---|---|---|---|---|---|---|---|---|---|---|---|
| Lommel | (Belgium) | 1 July 2022 | 14 January 2025 | 59 | 29 | 9 | 21 | 95 | 72 | +23 | 49.15 |
| Total | | | | 59 | 29 | 9 | 21 | 95 | 72 | +23 | 49.15 |

== Honours ==
Arsenal

- Football League First Division: 1988–89, 1990–91
- Premier League: 1997–98
- FA Cup: 1997–98
- FA Charity Shield: 1998
- European Cup Winners Cup: 1993–94

Individual

- Arsenal Player of the Season: 1990−91
