= Valur Gíslason =

Icelandic footballer

Personal information
- Full name: Valur Fannar Gíslason
- Date of birth: 8 September 1977 (age 49)
- Place of birth: Reykjavík, Iceland
- Height: 1.86 m (6 ft 1 in)
- Positions: Defender; midfielder

Senior career*
Years	Team	Apps	(Gls)
1994–1996	Fram	35	(3)
1996–1998	Arsenal	0	(0)
1997	→ Brighton & Hove Albion (loan)	7	(0)
1998–1999	Strømsgodset	19	(0)
2000–2001	Fram	31	(0)
2002–2005	Fylkir	61	(3)
2006	Valur	7	(1)
2007–2011	Fylkir	87	(12)
2012	Haukar	1	(0)
2016	Vatnaliljur	3	(0)
Total		251	(13)

International career
	Iceland U16	12	(1)
	Iceland U17	15	(2)
	Iceland U19	20	(3)
	Iceland U21	15	(1)
2000–2010	Iceland	5	(0)
- * Club domestic league appearances and goals

Valur Fannar Gíslason (born 8 September 1977) is an Icelandic former footballer who played as a defender and midfielder.

== Club career ==
Born in Reykjavík, Valur played for Fram, Arsenal, Brighton & Hove Albion, Strømsgodset, Fylkir, Valur, Haukar and Vatnaliljur.

== International career ==
Valur represented Iceland at under-16, under-17, under-19 and under-21 youth levels, and also earned 5 caps for the senior team.
