= David Hillier =

English footballer (born 1969)

Personal information
- Date of birth: 19 December 1969 (age 56)
- Place of birth: Blackheath, London, England
- Position: Midfielder

Youth career
- 1984–1988: Arsenal

Senior career*
Years	Team	Apps	(Gls)
1988–1996	Arsenal	143	(2)
1996–1999	Portsmouth	67	(4)
1999–2002	Bristol Rovers	83	(1)
2002–2003	Barnet	6	(0)
Total		260	(7)

International career
1991	England U21	1	(0)

Managerial career
- 2008–2010: Oldland Abbotonians
- 2010–2013: Almondsbury UWE
- * Club domestic league appearances and goals

David Hillier (born 19 December 1969) is an English former professional footballer. He played as a midfielder from 1988 until 2003, notably in the Premier League for Arsenal. He played in the Football League for Portsmouth, Bristol Rovers and Barnet. He also earned one cap for the England U21 side.

== Playing career ==
=== Arsenal ===
Hillier was born in Blackheath, London, attending secondary school at The John Roan, he played schoolboy football for his region before joining Arsenal in January 1984 as an associated schoolboy. He later became a trainee and turned professional in February 1988; Hillier captained the Arsenal side which beat Doncaster Rovers in the 1988 FA Youth Cup final. He progressed to the club's reserve side, winning the Football Combination in 1989–90, before making his first-team debut in a League Cup tie against Chester City on 25 September 1990, because Michael Thomas was injured and Siggi Jonsson was playing for Iceland. His league debut followed quickly at Leeds four days later. Hillier became a frequent player in the Arsenal side in the last months of that season, making 16 appearances (9 from start) in central midfield, as Arsenal won the First Division title with only a single defeat. He performed several exceptional marking jobs, curbing opponents like Jan Mølby, David Platt and Ray Wilkins.

The following two seasons Hillier became more of a regular fixture; and made a name for himself as a combative, strong tackling midfielder who would make up for any shortcomings in skill with his workrate. He played in the FA Cup defeat at Wrexham, who were bottom of the Fourth Division in January 1992 when they faced First Division Arsenal in the third round of the FA Cup at the Racecourse Ground.

Hillier scored his first league goal against Liverpool 20 April 1992 and established him further, especially with Paul Davis out of favour, and he was a regular at the heart of the midfield in 1992–93. He was instrumental in Arsenal's double-prolonged assault on Wembley after helping beat Tottenham in the FA Cup Semi-final. However a leg injury at Middlesbrough two days later meant he missed both the League Cup and FA Cup finals that season; Arsenal won both, the first time an English club had completed the Cup Double.

Hillier returned the next season 1993–94 but after only 15 appearances in the league and another injury forced him to miss the club's 1994 UEFA Cup Winners' Cup Final victory over Parma. By now he was less of a regular in the Arsenal side, especially after the signing of Stefan Schwarz. Although Hillier did finally play a cup final for Arsenal, substituted for Martin Keown, in the Gunners' unsuccessful defence of their Cup Winners Cup title in 1995, losing 2–1 to Real Zaragoza.

Despite this, Hillier's form had clearly declined since his early days at the club, and he was a marginal player under Bruce Rioch. Following several off the field incidents by the time Arsène Wenger succeeded Rioch in autumn 1996, Hillier did not feature in Wenger's future plans for the side. Having played 142 matches for Arsenal (scoring two goals), Hilliers last appearance with Arsenal, came as a substitute in the last minutes, against Leicester City 24 August 1996. He was told Portsmouth were interested, and he wanted First Team football which Hillier did not see happening at Arsenal.

=== Later career ===
Hillier left Arsenal in October 1996 for Portsmouth in a £250,000 deal. Despite being sent off on his debut against Oldham Athletic, he cemented himself a first team place at Fratton Park. Hillier played 61 matches in two and a half years for Pompey, before moving on again. Ian Holloway took him to Second Division Bristol Rovers in February 1999, where Hillier scored twice against Wycombe Wanderers in the League Cup and Luton Town in the league. He was released in 2002. He also had a spell at Barnet before retiring in 2003.

== Managerial career ==
Hillier was appointed manager of Oldland Abbotonians at the start of the 2008–09 season, before moving to Almondsbury UWE in 2010 and was Almondsbury manager until 2013.

== Coaching ==
Hillier teamed up with amateur player Yinka Brownlow to provide football coaching in association with The University of the West of England for talented youngsters in the Bristol area.

== Personal life ==
After his football career, Hillier worked as a fireman in the Bristol area.

He is a co-commentator on Arsenal matches for Arsenal TV, does guest appearances and after dinner speeches, and attends charity events for Arsenal legends. He also supports local football clubs in the Bristol area.
