= Mark Flatts =

English footballer

Personal information
- Full name: Mark Michael Flatts
- Date of birth: 14 October 1972 (age 54)
- Place of birth: Haringey, London, England
- Position: Midfielder

Youth career
- 1990–1992: Arsenal

Senior career*
Years	Team	Apps	(Gls)
1990–1996	Arsenal	17	(0)
1993	→ Cambridge United (loan)	5	(1)
1993–1994	→ Brighton & Hove Albion (loan)	10	(1)
1995	→ Bristol City (loan)	6	(0)
1996	→ Grimsby Town (loan)	5	(0)
Total		43	(2)
- * Club domestic league appearances and goals

Mark Michael Flatts (born 14 October 1972) is an English former footballer who played in midfield. He started out in the top flight as a trainee with Arsenal.

== Playing career ==
Born in Haringey, London, England, Flatts was a trainee with Arsenal, making his debut against Sheffield United on 19 September 1992. He played 19 games in all competitions for Arsenal between 1992 and 1996. During his Arsenal career, he had loan spells at Cambridge United, Brighton & Hove Albion, Bristol City and Grimsby Town.

He was released by Arsenal in 1996 and had trials at various clubs including Torino and in England. He was signed by former Arsenal player Martin Hayes at Bishop's Stortford.
