= 2004–05 Chester City F.C. season =

Chester City F.C.
2004–05 season
- Manager: Ray Mathias (until 29 August); Ian Rush (until 4 April); David Bell (caretaker)
- Stadium: Deva Stadium
- Football League Two: 20th
- FA Cup: Round 3
- Football League Cup: Round 1
- Football League Trophy: Area Quarterfinal
- Top goalscorer: League: Michael Branch (11); All: Michael Branch (13)
- Highest home attendance: 3,803 vs Swansea City (2 October)
- Lowest home attendance: 1,643 vs Cheltenham Town (1 February)
- Average home league attendance: 2,812; 21st in division

The 2004–05 season was the 63rd season of competitive association football in the Football League played by Chester City, an English club based in Chester, Cheshire.

Also, it was the first season spent in the Football League Two, after the promotion from the Football Conference in 2004. Alongside competing in the Football League the club also participated in the FA Cup, the Football League Cup and the Football League Trophy.

== Football League ==
Pos	Team	Pld	W	D	L	GF	GA	GD	Pts
18	Grimsby Town	46	14	16	16	51	52	−1	58
19	Notts County	46	13	13	20	46	62	−16	52
20	Chester City	46	12	16	18	43	69	−26	52
21	Shrewsbury Town	46	11	16	19	48	53	−5	49
22	Rushden & Diamonds	46	10	14	22	42	63	−21	44

Updated to match(es) played on 15 September 2009. Source: 2004–05 League Two
Rules for classification: 1) points; 2) goal difference; 3) number of goals scored.

=== Results summary ===
Overall								Home						Away					
Pld	W	D	L	GF	GA	GD	Pts	W	D	L	GF	GA	GD	W	D	L	GF	GA	GD
46	12	16	18	43	69	−26	52	7	8	8	25	33	−8	5	8	10	18	36	−18

Source: rsssf.com

=== Results by matchday ===
Round	1	2	3	4	5	6	7	8	9	10	11	12	13	14	15	16	17	18	19	20	21	22	23	24	25	26	27	28	29	30	31	32	33	34	35	36	37	38	39	40	41	42	43	44	45	46
Result	D	L	L	D	L	L	W	W	D	D	D	D	W	W	W	L	D	D	L	L	D	L	D	D	W	L	D	D	L	L	W	W	L	L	L	D	L	W	D	W	L	W	D	L	L	W
Position	11	19	23	24	24	24	24	20	21	21	20	19	19	18	14	17	15	14	19	19	19	19	19	19	19	19	19	20	20	20	19	19	21	21	21	21	21	21	21	19	21	20	20	20	20	20

Source: 11v11.com
W = Win; D = Draw; L = Loss

=== Matches ===
Date	Opponents	Venue	Result	Score	Scorers	Attendance
7 August	Notts County	A	D	1–1	Rapley	6,423
10 August	Wycombe Wanderers	H	L	0–2		2,881
14 August	Mansfield Town	H	L	0–3		2,648
21 August	Bury	A	D	1–1	Branch	2,870
28 August	Darlington	H	L	0–3		2,392
30 August	Boston United	A	L	1–3	Branch (pen)	2,698
4 September	Macclesfield Town	H	W	1–0	Collins	2,913
11 September	Scunthorpe United	A	W	2–1	Bolland, Ellison	4,203
18 September	Cambridge United	H	D	0–0		2,771
25 September	Lincoln City	A	D	1–1	Ellison	3,985
2 October	Swansea City	H	D	1–1	Rapley	3,803
8 October	Cheltenham Town	A	D	0–0		3,670
16 October	Rushden & Diamonds	A	W	1–0	Drummond	2,735
23 October	Grimsby Town	H	W	2–1	Branch (2)	3,233
26 October	Kidderminster Harriers	H	W	3–0	Branch, Davies, Ellison	2,968
30 October	Yeovil Town	A	L	1–4	Clare (pen)	5,741
6 November	Leyton Orient	H	D	1–1	Belle	3,125
19 November	Northampton Town	A	D	1–1	Ellison	5,625
27 November	Oxford United	H	L	1–3	Ellison	2,791
7 December	Bristol Rovers	A	L	1–4	Ellison	5,524
11 December	Shrewsbury Town	H	D	1–1	Branch (pen)	3,219
17 December	Southend United	A	L	0–1		4,837
26 December	Scunthorpe United	H	D	1–1	Ellison	3,216
28 December	Rochdale	A	D	2–2	Ellison, Branch	3,724
1 January	Macclesfield Town	A	W	2–1	Drummond, Ellison	3,076
3 January	Lincoln City	H	L	0–1		2,839
15 January	Cambridge United	A	D	0–0		3,185
22 January	Rochdale	H	D	0–0		2,985
29 January	Swansea City	A	L	0–3		8,989
1 February	Cheltenham Town	H	L	0–3		1,643
5 February	Rushden & Diamonds	H	W	3–1	Atieno, Hessey, O'Neill	2,340
12 February	Kidderminster Harriers	A	W	1–0	Drummond	2,779
19 February	Yeovil Town	H	L	0–2		3,072
22 February	Grimsby Town	A	L	0–1		3,144
26 February	Shrewsbury Town	A	L	0–5		4,859
5 March	Southend United	H	D	2–2	Walsh, Davies	2,396
12 March	Wycombe Wanderers	A	L	2–4	Branch (2, 1 pen)	8,124
19 March	Notts County	H	W	3–2	Drummond, Branch (2)	2,324
25 March	Mansfield Town	A	D	0–0		3,437
28 March	Bury	H	W	2–1	Lowe (2)	3,107
2 April	Darlington	A	L	0–1		3,778
9 April	Boston United	H	W	2–1	Booth, Lowe	2,040
16 April	Bristol Rovers	H	D	2–2	Drummond (2)	2,475
23 April	Leyton Orient	A	L	0–2		3,192
30 April	Northampton Town	H	L	0–2		3,455
7 May	Oxford United	A	W	1–0	Lowe	5,055

== FA Cup ==
Round	Date	Opponents	Venue	Result	Score	Scorers	Attendance
First round	13 November	Stafford Rangers (6)	A	W	2–0	Belle, Rapley	2,492
Second round	4 December	Halifax Town (5)	A	W	3–1	Branch (2, 1 pen), Rapley	4,497
Third round	8 January	AFC Bournemouth (3)	A	L	1–2	Ellison	7,653

== League Cup ==
Round	Date	Opponents	Venue	Result	Score	Scorers	Attendance
First round first leg	24 August	Sunderland (2)	H	L	0–3		11,450

== Football League Trophy ==
Round	Date	Opponents	Venue	Result	Score	Scorers	Attendance
First round	28 September	Sheffield Wednesday (3)	A	W	2–1	Ellison, Hope	7,640
Second round	2 November	Rochdale (4)	H	W	1–0	Hessey	1,419
Quarterfinal	30 November	Wrexham (3)	H	L	0–1		5,028

== Season statistics ==
Nat	Player	Total		League		FA Cup		League Cup		FL Trophy	
Nat	Player	A	G	A	G	A	G	A	G	A	G
Goalkeepers
(England)	Wayne Brown	26	–	23	–	1	–	1	–	1	–
(Republic of Ireland)	Colin Doyle	1	–	–	–	–	–	–	–	1	–
(England)	Chris Mackenzie	26+1	–	23+1	–	2	–	–	–	1	–
Field players
(Tanzania)	Eddie Anaclet	0+1	–	–	–	0+1	–	–	–	–	–
(Kenya)	Taiwo Atieno	3+1	1	3+1	1	–	–	–	–	–	–
(England)	David Bayliss	10	–	9	–	1	–	–	–	–	–
(England)	Cortez Belle	19+6	2	17+5	1	1+1	1	1	–	–	–
(England)	Phil Bolland	48	1	42	1	2	–	1	–	3	–
(England)	Robbie Booth	10+6	1	7+4	1	1+1	–	–	–	2+1	–
(England)	Michael Branch	33+3	13	31+2	11	1	2	1	–	0+1	–
(England)	Michael Brown	12+7	–	11+7	–	1	–	–	–	–	–
(England)	Paul Carden	42+5	–	36+4	–	3	–	0+1	–	3	–
(Republic of Ireland)	Daryl Clare	5+4	1	3+4	1	1	–	–	–	1	–
(England)	Danny Collins	13	1	12	1	–	–	1	–	–	–
(England)	Ben Davies	41+8	2	38+6	2	2	–	0+1	–	1+1	–
(England)	Stewart Drummond	48+3	6	44+1	6	2	–	1	–	1+2	–
(England)	Darren Edmondson	28+1	–	26+1	–	2	–	–	–	–	–
(England)	Kevin Ellison	30	11	24	9	3	1	1	–	2	1
(Cameroon)	George Elokobi	4+1	–	4+1	–	–	–	–	–	–	–
(Scotland)	Robbie Foy	13	–	13	–	–	–	–	–	–	–
(England)	Andy Harris	13+11	–	9+10	–	1+1	–	–	–	3	–
(England)	Sean Hessey	37+3	2	31+3	1	3	–	1	–	2	1
(Wales)	Ian Hillier	7+1	–	7+1	–	–	–	–	–	–	–
(England)	Richard Hope	29+4	1	26+2	–	2	–	–	–	1+2	1
(England)	Ryan Lowe	8	4	8	4	–	–	–	–	–	–
(England)	Gavin Lynch	0+2	–	0+1	–	0+1	–	–	–	–	–
(England)	Kevin McIntyre	14+2	–	9+1	–	1+1	–	1	–	3	–
(England)	Alan Navarro	4	–	3	–	–	–	1	–	–	–
(England)	Joe O'Neill	5+6	1	5+6	1	–	–	–	–	–	–
(England)	Andrew Nicholas	5	–	5	–	–	–	–	–	–	–
(England)	Kevin Rapley	16+11	4	12+9	2	1+2	2	–	–	3	–
(England)	Carl Regan	4+2	–	4+2	–	–	–	–	–	–	–
(England)	Ashley Sestanovich	3+4	–	3+4	–	–	–	–	–	–	–
(England)	Darryn Stamp	3+2	–	2+2	–	–	–	–	–	1	–
(England)	Stephen Vaughan	20+7	–	14+7	–	2	–	1	–	3	–
(England)	Michael Walsh	2+4	1	2+3	1	0+1	–	–	–	–	–
(England)	Andy Watson	1	–	–	–	–	–	–	–	1	–
(England)	Shaun Whalley	0+5	–	0+3	–	–	–	–	–	0+2	–
	Total	53	52	46	43	3	6	1	–	3	3
