= 1997–98 Everton F.C. season =

English football club season

Everton F.C.
1997–98 season
- Chairman: Peter Johnson
- Manager: Howard Kendall
- Stadium: Goodison Park
- FA Premier League: 17th
- FA Cup: Third round
- League Cup: Third round
- Top goalscorer: League: Duncan Ferguson (11); All: Duncan Ferguson (11)
- Average home league attendance: 35,376

During the 1997–98 English football season, Everton competed in the FA Premier League.

== Season summary ==
Everton began the season with three new signings – Slaven Bilić, John Oster and Gareth Farrelly – but the big news at Goodison Park was the return of Howard Kendall for his third spell as manager.

With financial problems growing and fans growing ever more hostile towards chairman Peter Johnson and with legendary goalkeeper Neville Southall leaving the club in March 1998 after 17 years, Kendall was soon facing the biggest struggle of his managerial career. Everton – top division members continuously since 1954 – were battling against relegation and looked anything but a trophy-winning team that they so often had been during Kendall's earlier spells. They ended up surviving, but only avoided relegation to Division One because they had a greater goal difference than 18th-placed Bolton Wanderers. That kept Everton up, but Kendall resigned just weeks later and was replaced by former Rangers manager Walter Smith.

== Final league table ==
Pos	Team	Pld	W	D	L	GF	GA	GD	Pts	Qualification or relegation
15	Wimbledon	38	10	14	14	34	46	−12	44	
16	Sheffield Wednesday	38	12	8	18	52	67	−15	44	
17	Everton	38	9	13	16	41	56	−15	40	
18	Bolton Wanderers (R)	38	9	13	16	41	61	−20	40	Relegation to the Football League First Division
19	Barnsley (R)	38	10	5	23	37	82	−45	35	Relegation to the Football League First Division

Source: Premier League
Rules for classification: 1) points; 2) goal difference; 3) number of goals scored.
(R) Relegated

Results summary

Overall								Home						Away					
Pld	W	D	L	GF	GA	GD	Pts	W	D	L	GF	GA	GD	W	D	L	GF	GA	GD
38	9	13	16	41	56	−15	40	7	5	7	25	27	−2	2	8	9	16	29	−13

Source: 1997-98 FA Premier League table

Results by round

Round	1	2	3	4	5	6	7	8	9	10	11	12	13	14	15	16	17	18	19	20	21	22	23	24	25	26	27	28	29	30	31	32	33	34	35	36	37	38
Ground	H	H	H	A	A	H	A	H	A	H	A	H	A	A	A	H	A	H	A	A	H	A	H	A	A	H	A	H	A	H	H	A	H	A	H	H	A	H
Result	L	W	L	D	L	W	L	D	L	W	D	L	L	L	L	L	D	D	W	L	W	W	W	D	D	L	D	D	L	W	L	D	W	D	D	L	L	D
Position	16	11	15	14	18	13	16	16	18	15	16	17	17	20	20	20	19	19	19	19	18	15	13	14	15	16	16	16	16	16	17	17	15	16	16	17	18	17

Source: 11v11.com: 1997-98 Everton results
A = Away; H = Home; W = Win; D = Draw; L = Loss

== Results ==
Everton's score comes first

=== Legend ===
Win	Draw	Loss

=== FA Premier League ===
Date	Opponent	Venue	Result	Attendance	Scorers
9 August 1997	Crystal Palace	H	1–2	35,716	Ferguson
23 August 1997	West Ham United	H	2–1	34,356	Speed, Stuart
27 August 1997	Manchester United	H	0–2	40,079	
1 September 1997	Bolton Wanderers	A	0–0	23,131	
13 September 1997	Derby County	A	1–3	27,828	Stuart
20 September 1997	Barnsley	H	4–2	32,659	Speed (2, 1 pen), Cadamarteri, Oster
24 September 1997	Newcastle United	A	0–1	36,705	
27 September 1997	Arsenal	H	2–2	35,457	Ball, Cadamarteri
4 October 1997	Sheffield Wednesday	A	1–3	24,486	Cadamarteri
18 October 1997	Liverpool	H	2–0	40,112	Ruddock (own goal), Cadamarteri
25 October 1997	Coventry City	A	0–0	18,760	
2 November 1997	Southampton	H	0–2	29,565	
8 November 1997	Blackburn Rovers	A	2–3	25,397	Speed, Ferguson
22 November 1997	Aston Villa	A	1–2	36,389	Speed (pen)
26 November 1997	Chelsea	A	0–2	34,148	
29 November 1997	Tottenham Hotspur	H	0–2	36,670	
6 December 1997	Leeds United	A	0–0	34,869	
13 December 1997	Wimbledon	H	0–0	28,533	
20 December 1997	Leicester City	A	1–0	20,628	Speed (pen)
26 December 1997	Manchester United	A	0–2	55,167	
28 December 1997	Bolton Wanderers	H	3–2	37,149	Ferguson (3)
10 January 1998	Crystal Palace	A	3–1	23,311	Barmby, Ferguson, Madar
18 January 1998	Chelsea	H	3–1	32,355	Speed, Ferguson, Duberry (own goal)
31 January 1998	West Ham United	A	2–2	25,909	Barmby, Madar
7 February 1998	Barnsley	A	2–2	18,672	Ferguson, Grant
14 February 1998	Derby County	H	1–2	34,876	Thomsen
23 February 1998	Liverpool	A	1–1	44,501	Ferguson
28 February 1998	Newcastle United	H	0–0	37,972	
7 March 1998	Southampton	A	1–2	15,102	Tiler
14 March 1998	Blackburn Rovers	H	1–0	33,423	Madar
28 March 1998	Aston Villa	H	1–4	36,471	Madar
4 April 1998	Tottenham Hotspur	A	1–1	35,624	Madar
11 April 1998	Leeds United	H	2–0	37,099	Hutchison, Ferguson
13 April 1998	Wimbledon	A	0–0	15,131	
18 April 1998	Leicester City	H	1–1	33,642	Madar
25 April 1998	Sheffield Wednesday	H	1–3	35,497	Ferguson
3 May 1998	Arsenal	A	0–4	38,269	
10 May 1998	Coventry City	H	1–1	40,109	Farrelly

=== FA Cup ===
Round	Date	Opponent	Venue	Result	Attendance	Goalscorers
R3	4 January 1998	Newcastle United	H	0–1	20,885	

=== League Cup ===
Round	Date	Opponent	Venue	Result	Attendance	Goalscorers
R2 1st leg	16 September 1997	Scunthorpe United	A	1–0	7,145	Farrelly
R2 2nd leg	1 October 1997	Scunthorpe United	H	5–0 (won 6–0 on agg)	11,562	Stuart, Oster, Barmby (2), Cadamarteri
R3	15 October 1997	Coventry City	A	1–4	10,087	Barmby

== Squad (at end of season) ==
Note: Flags indicate national team as defined under FIFA eligibility rules; some limited exceptions apply. Players may hold more than one non-FIFA nationality.

No.	Pos.	Nation	Player
4	MF	(England) ENG	Danny Williamson
5	DF	(England) ENG	Dave Watson (captain)
6	DF	(Republic of Ireland) IRL	Terry Phelan
7	FW	(France) FRA	Mickaël Madar
8	MF	(England) ENG	Nick Barmby
9	FW	(Scotland) SCO	Duncan Ferguson (Vice-captain)
10	MF	(Scotland) SCO	Don Hutchison
11	FW	(Scotland) SCO	John Spencer (on loan from QPR)
12	DF	(England) ENG	Craig Short
13	GK	(England) ENG	Paul Gerrard
14	MF	(England) ENG	Tony Grant
15	MF	(England) ENG	Peter Beagrie (on loan from Bradford City)
16	FW	(England) ENG	Michael Branch
17	MF	(Republic of Ireland) IRL	Gareth Farrelly
18	MF	(England) ENG	Joe Parkinson

No.	Pos.	Nation	Player
19	MF	(Wales) WAL	John Oster
20	DF	(England) ENG	Tony Thomas
21	MF	(England) ENG	Mitch Ward
22	MF	(England) ENG	Gavin McCann
23	DF	(England) ENG	Carl Tiler
25	DF	(England) ENG	Michael Ball
26	DF	(England) ENG	Graham Allen
27	DF	(Republic of Ireland) IRL	Richard Dunne
28	DF	(Croatia) CRO	Slaven Bilić
29	FW	(England) ENG	Danny Cadamarteri
30	FW	(England) ENG	Phil Jevons
31	GK	(Norway) NOR	Thomas Myhre
32	DF	(England) ENG	John O'Kane
33	GK	(England) ENG	John O'Toole
34	FW	(England) ENG	Francis Jeffers

=== Left club during season ===
Note: Flags indicate national team as defined under FIFA eligibility rules; some limited exceptions apply. Players may hold more than one non-FIFA nationality.

No.	Pos.	Nation	Player
1	GK	(Wales) WAL	Neville Southall (to Stoke City)
2	DF	(England) ENG	Earl Barrett (to Sheffield Wednesday)
3	DF	(England) ENG	Andy Hinchcliffe (to Sheffield Wednesday)
7	MF	(England) ENG	Graham Stuart (to Sheffield United)
10	MF	(Wales) WAL	Gary Speed (captain) (to Newcastle United)

No.	Pos.	Nation	Player
15	DF	(Denmark) DEN	Claus Thomsen (to AB)
24	DF	(England) ENG	Jon O'Connor (to Sheffield United)
32	MF	(England) ENG	Chris Lane (to Hereford United)
35	DF	(England) ENG	John Hills (to Blackpool)

=== Reserve squad ===
Note: Flags indicate national team as defined under FIFA eligibility rules; some limited exceptions apply. Players may hold more than one non-FIFA nationality.

No.	Pos.	Nation	Player
-	GK	(Republic of Ireland) IRL	Dean Delany
-	DF	(England) ENG	Adam Eaton
-	DF	(England) ENG	Adam Farley
-	MF	(England) ENG	Matt McKay

No.	Pos.	Nation	Player
-	MF	(England) ENG	Jamie Milligan
-	MF	(England) ENG	Mick O'Brien
-	DF	(England) ENG	Carl Regan

== Transfers ==
=== In ===
Date	Pos	Name	From	Fee
1 July 1997	MF	Gareth Farrelly	Aston Villa	Transfer
1 August 1997	MF	John Oster	Grimsby Town	£1,500,000
6 August 1997	DF	Tony Thomas	Tranmere Rovers	£400,000
15 August 1997	MF	Danny Williamson	West Ham United	Swap
27 November 1997	GK	Thomas Myhre	Viking	£800,000
28 November 1997	MF	Mitch Ward	Sheffield United	£750,000
28 November 1997	DF	Carl Tiler	Sheffield United	£750,000
30 December 1997	FW	Mickaël Madar	Deportivo La Coruña	Free transfer
28 January 1998	DF	John O'Kane	Manchester United	£400,000
26 February 1998	MF	Don Hutchison	Sheffield United	£1,000,000
26 March 1998	MF	Matt McKay	Chester City	Signed

=== Out ===
Date	Pos	Name	To	Fee
15 August 1997	DF	David Unsworth	West Ham United	Swap
28 November 1997	MF	Graham Stuart	Sheffield United	£500,000
30 January 1998	MF	Andy Hinchcliffe	Sheffield Wednesday	£3,000,000
6 February 1998	MF	Gary Speed	Newcastle United	£5,500,000
13 February 1998	DF	John Hills	Blackpool	Signed
24 February 1998	DF	Earl Barrett	Sheffield Wednesday	Free transfer
26 February 1998	DF	Jon O'Connor	Sheffield United	Transfer
3 March 1998	DF	Claus Thomsen	AB	£500,000
12 March 1998	GK	Neville Southall	Stoke City	Free transfer

Transfers in: ▼£5,600,000
Transfers out: ▲£9,500,000
Total spending: ▲£3,900,000

== Statistics ==
=== Appearances and goals ===
No.	Pos	Nat	Player	Total		FA Premier League		FA Cup		League Cup	
No.	Pos	Nat	Player	Apps	Goals	Apps	Goals	Apps	Goals	Apps	Goals
Goalkeepers
13	GK	(England) ENG	Paul Gerrard	6	0	4	0	0	0	2	0
31	GK	(Norway) NOR	Thomas Myhre	23	0	22	0	1	0	0	0
Defenders
5	DF	(England) ENG	Dave Watson	29	0	25+1	0	0	0	3	0
6	DF	(Republic of Ireland) IRL	Terry Phelan	10	0	8+1	0	0	0	0+1	0
12	DF	(England) ENG	Craig Short	33	0	27+4	0	0	0	2	0
20	DF	(England) ENG	Tony Thomas	9	0	6+1	0	1	0	1	0
23	DF	(England) ENG	Carl Tiler	20	1	19	1	1	0	0	0
25	DF	(England) ENG	Michael Ball	28	1	21+4	1	1	0	1+1	0
26	DF	(England) ENG	Graham Allen	5	0	2+3	0	0	0	0	0
27	DF	(Republic of Ireland) IRL	Richard Dunne	4	0	2+1	0	1	0	0	0
28	DF	(Croatia) CRO	Slaven Bilić	27	0	22+2	0	0	0	3	0
32	DF	(England) ENG	John O'Kane	12	0	12	0	0	0	0	0
Midfielders
4	MF	(England) ENG	Danny Williamson	17	0	15	0	0	0	2	0
8	MF	(England) ENG	Nick Barmby	33	5	26+4	2	1	0	1+1	3
10	MF	(Scotland) SCO	Don Hutchison	11	1	11	1	0	0	0	0
14	MF	(England) ENG	Tony Grant	9	1	7	1	1	0	1	0
15	MF	(England) ENG	Peter Beagrie	6	0	4+2	0	0	0	0	0
17	MF	(Republic of Ireland) IRL	Gareth Farrelly	28	2	18+8	1	1	0	1	1
19	MF	(Wales) WAL	John Oster	35	2	16+15	1	0+1	0	3	1
21	MF	(England) ENG	Mitch Ward	8	0	8	0	0	0	0	0
22	MF	(England) ENG	Gavin McCann	11	0	5+6	0	0	0	0	0
Forwards
7	FW	(France) FRA	Mickaël Madar	17	6	15+2	6	0	0	0	0
9	FW	(Scotland) SCO	Duncan Ferguson	32	11	28+1	11	1	0	2	0
11	FW	(Scotland) SCO	John Spencer	6	0	3+3	0	0	0	0	0
16	FW	(England) ENG	Michael Branch	6	0	1+5	0	0	0	0	0
16	FW	(England) ENG	Danny Cadamarteri	29	5	15+10	4	1	0	1+2	1
34	FW	(England) ENG	Francis Jeffers	1	0	0+1	0	0	0	0	0
Players who left the club during the season
1	GK	(Wales) WAL	Neville Southall	13	0	12	0	0	0	1	0
2	DF	(England) ENG	Earl Barrett	13	0	12+1	0	0	0	0	0
3	DF	(England) ENG	Andy Hinchcliffe	20	0	15+2	0	0	0	3	0
7	MF	(England) ENG	Graham Stuart	17	3	14	2	0	0	3	1
10	MF	(Wales) WAL	Gary Speed	24	7	21	7	0	0	3	0
15	DF	(Denmark) DEN	Claus Thomsen	9	1	2+6	1	1	0	0	0
24	DF	(England) ENG	Jon O'Connor	1	0	0+1	0	0	0	0	0

=== Starting 11 ===
Considering starts in all competitions

- GK: #31, (Norway) Thomas Myhre, 23
- RB: #12, (England) Craig Short, 29
- CB: #28, (Croatia) Slaven Bilić, 25
- CB: #5, (England) Dave Watson, 28
- LB: #25, (England) Michael Ball, 23
- RM: #19, (Wales) John Oster, 19
- CM: #7, (England) Graham Stuart, 17
- CM: #17, (Republic of Ireland) Gareth Farrelly, 20
- LM: #10, (Wales) Gary Speed, 24
- AM: #8, (England) Nick Barmby, 28
- CF: #9, (Scotland) Duncan Ferguson, 31
