= 1996–97 Everton F.C. season =

English football club season

Everton F.C.
1996–97 season
- Chairman: Peter Johnson
- Manager: Joe Royle (until 27 March 1997); Dave Watson (caretaker from 27 March 1997)
- Stadium: Goodison Park
- FA Premier League: 15th
- FA Cup: Fourth Round
- League Cup: Second Round
- Top goalscorer: League: Duncan Ferguson (10); All: Duncan Ferguson, Gary Speed (11)
- Highest home attendance: 40,177 vs Liverpool (16 April 1997, FA Premier League)
- Lowest home attendance: 11,527 vs York City (18 September 1996, League Cup)
- Average home league attendance: 36,186

During the 1996–97 English football season, Everton F.C. competed in the FA Premier League.

== Season summary ==
After finishing sixth the previous season, Everton started the new season with much hope and ambitions of qualifying for Europe or winning a major trophy. But the mid-season sale of top scoring winger Andrei Kanchelskis to Fiorentina sabotaged Everton's chances of more success, and manager Joe Royle resigned in March, less than two years after guiding the club to FA Cup glory. Captain Dave Watson took over as acting manager and confirmed Everton's survival with a 15th-place finish, before Howard Kendall returned to Goodison Park for his third spell as manager.

== Final league table ==
Pos	Team	Pld	W	D	L	GF	GA	GD	Pts
13	Blackburn Rovers	38	9	15	14	42	43	−1	42
14	West Ham United	38	10	12	16	39	48	−9	42
15	Everton	38	10	12	16	44	57	−13	42
16	Southampton	38	10	11	17	50	56	−6	41
17	Coventry City	38	9	14	15	38	54	−16	41

Source: Premier League
Rules for classification: 1) points; 2) goal difference; 3) number of goals scored.

Results summary

Overall								Home						Away					
Pld	W	D	L	GF	GA	GD	Pts	W	D	L	GF	GA	GD	W	D	L	GF	GA	GD
38	10	12	16	44	57	−13	42	7	4	8	24	22	+2	3	8	8	20	35	−15

Source: Statto

Results by round

Round	1	2	3	4	5	6	7	8	9	10	11	12	13	14	15	16	17	18	19	20	21	22	23	24	25	26	27	28	29	30	31	32	33	34	35	36	37	38
Ground	H	A	A	H	A	H	A	H	H	A	H	H	A	A	H	A	A	H	A	H	H	A	A	A	H	A	H	A	A	H	H	A	H	H	H	A	A	H
Result	W	D	D	L	L	L	D	W	W	W	D	W	D	W	L	D	W	D	L	L	L	L	L	L	W	D	L	D	L	W	L	L	D	W	D	D	L	L
Position	3	5	7	11	15	16	15	13	9	8	9	8	7	6	8	8	7	7	8	8	8	9	9	12	9	10	11	12	12	13	13	14	14	12	12	11	12	15

Source: Statto.com
A = Away; H = Home; W = Win; D = Draw; L = Loss

== Results ==
Everton's score comes first

=== Legend ===
Win	Draw	Loss

=== FA Premier League ===
Date	Opponent	Venue	Result	Attendance	Scorers
17 August 1996	Newcastle United	H	2–0	40,117	Unsworth (pen), Speed
21 August 1996	Manchester United	A	2–2	54,943	Ferguson (2)
24 August 1996	Tottenham Hotspur	A	0–0	29,696	
4 September 1996	Aston Villa	H	0–1	39,115	
7 September 1996	Wimbledon	A	0–4	13,684	
14 September 1996	Middlesbrough	H	1–2	39,250	Short
21 September 1996	Blackburn Rovers	A	1–1	27,091	Unsworth
28 September 1996	Sheffield Wednesday	H	2–0	34,160	Kanchelskis, Stuart
12 October 1996	West Ham United	H	2–1	36,571	Stuart, Speed
28 October 1996	Nottingham Forest	A	1–0	19,892	Short
4 November 1996	Coventry City	H	1–1	31,477	Stuart
16 November 1996	Southampton	H	7–1	35,669	Stuart, Kanchelskis (2), Speed (3), Barmby
20 November 1996	Liverpool	A	1–1	40,751	Speed
23 November 1996	Leicester City	A	2–1	20,975	Hinchcliffe, Unsworth
30 November 1996	Sunderland	H	1–3	40,087	Ferguson
7 December 1996	Chelsea	A	2–2	28,418	Branch, Kanchelskis
16 December 1996	Derby County	A	1–0	17,252	Barmby
21 December 1996	Leeds United	H	0–0	36,954	
26 December 1996	Middlesbrough	A	2–4	29,673	Unsworth, Ferguson
28 December 1996	Wimbledon	H	1–3	36,733	Stuart
1 January 1997	Blackburn Rovers	H	0–2	30,427	
11 January 1997	Sheffield Wednesday	A	1–2	24,175	Ferguson
19 January 1997	Arsenal	A	1–3	38,095	Ferguson
29 January 1997	Newcastle United	A	1–4	36,143	Speed
1 February 1997	Nottingham Forest	H	2–0	32,567	Ferguson, Barmby
22 February 1997	Coventry City	A	0–0	19,497	
1 March 1997	Arsenal	H	0–2	36,980	
5 March 1997	Southampton	A	2–2	15,134	Ferguson, Speed
8 March 1997	Leeds United	A	0–1	32,055	
15 March 1997	Derby County	H	1–0	32,140	D Watson
22 March 1997	Manchester United	H	0–2	40,079	
5 April 1997	Aston Villa	A	1–3	39,339	Unsworth
9 April 1997	Leicester City	H	1–1	30,368	Branch
12 April 1997	Tottenham Hotspur	H	1–0	36,380	Speed
16 April 1997	Liverpool	H	1–1	40,177	Ferguson
19 April 1997	West Ham United	A	2–2	24,545	Branch, Ferguson
3 May 1997	Sunderland	A	0–3	22,108	
11 May 1997	Chelsea	H	1–2	38,321	Barmby

=== FA Cup ===
Round	Date	Opponent	Venue	Result	Attendance	Goalscorers
R3	5 January 1997	Swindon Town	H	3–0	20,411	Kanchelskis, Barmby, Ferguson
R4	25 January 1997	Bradford City	H	2–3	30,007	O'Brien (own goal), Speed

=== League Cup ===
Round	Date	Opponent	Venue	Result	Attendance	Goalscorers
R2 1st Leg	18 September 1996	York City	H	1–1	11,527	Kanchelskis
R2 2nd Leg	24 September 1996	York City	A	2–3	7,354	Rideout, Speed

== Squad ==
Note: Flags indicate national team as defined under FIFA eligibility rules; some limited exceptions apply. Players may hold more than one non-FIFA nationality.

No.	Pos.	Nation	Player
1	GK	WAL	Neville Southall
2	DF	ENG	Earl Barrett
3	DF	ENG	Andy Hinchcliffe
4	DF	ENG	David Unsworth
5	DF	ENG	Dave Watson (captain)
6	DF	IRL	Terry Phelan
7	MF	ENG	Graham Stuart
8	FW	ENG	Paul Rideout
9	FW	SCO	Duncan Ferguson
10	MF	WAL	Gary Speed
12	MF	ENG	Nick Barmby
13	GK	ENG	Paul Gerrard
15	DF	DEN	Claus Thomsen
17	DF	ENG	Adam Eaton
18	MF	ENG	Joe Parkinson

No.	Pos.	Nation	Player
19	DF	SUI	Marc Hottiger
20	MF	ENG	Tony Grant
21	DF	ENG	Craig Short
22	MF	ENG	Gavin McCann
23	FW	ENG	Michael Branch
24	DF	ENG	Jon O'Connor
25	DF	ENG	Michael Ball
26	DF	ENG	Graham Allen
27	DF	IRL	Richard Dunne
28	FW	ENG	Danny Cadamarteri
30	MF	ENG	Richard Townsend
32	MF	ENG	Robert Tynan
34	DF	ENG	Edward Hussin
35	DF	ENG	John Hills

=== Left club during season ===
Note: Flags indicate national team as defined under FIFA eligibility rules; some limited exceptions apply. Players may hold more than one non-FIFA nationality.

No.	Pos.	Nation	Player
11	MF	SWE	Anders Limpar (to Birmingham City)
14	MF	ENG	John Ebbrell (to Sheffield United)
15	DF	ENG	Matt Jackson (to Norwich City)
16	MF	ENG	Vinny Samways (to UD Las Palmas)
17	MF	RUS	Andrei Kanchelskis (to ACF Fiorentina)

No.	Pos.	Nation	Player
22	MF	ENG	Peter Holcroft (to Swindon Town)
25	DF	ENG	Neil Moore (to Norwich City)
27	MF	ENG	Mark Grugel
28	MF	ENG	Chris Price
33	GK	ENG	James Speare (to Darlington)

=== Reserve squad ===
Note: Flags indicate national team as defined under FIFA eligibility rules; some limited exceptions apply. Players may hold more than one non-FIFA nationality.

No.	Pos.	Nation	Player
-	FW	ENG	Mark Quayle

== Statistics ==
=== Appearances and goals ===
No.	Pos	Nat	Player	Total		Premier League		FA Cup		League Cup	
No.	Pos	Nat	Player	Apps	Goals	Apps	Goals	Apps	Goals	Apps	Goals
Goalkeepers
1	GK	(Wales) WAL	Neville Southall	38	0	34	0	2	0	2	0
13	GK	(England) ENG	Paul Gerrard	5	0	4+1	0	0	0	0	0
Defenders
2	DF	(England) ENG	Earl Barrett	40	0	36	0	2	0	2	0
3	DF	(England) ENG	Andy Hinchcliffe	20	1	18	1	0	0	2	0
4	DF	(England) ENG	David Unsworth	36	5	32+2	5	0	0	2	0
5	DF	(England) ENG	Dave Watson	31	1	29	1	2	0	0	0
6	DF	(Republic of Ireland) IRL	Terry Phelan	16	0	15	0	1	0	0	0
15	DF	(Denmark) DEN	Claus Thomsen	16	0	15+1	0	0	0	0	0
19	DF	(Switzerland) SUI	Marc Hottiger	9	0	4+4	0	0	0	1	0
21	DF	(England) ENG	Craig Short	25	2	19+4	2	1	0	1	0
25	DF	(England) ENG	Michael Ball	5	0	2+3	0	0	0	0	0
26	DF	(England) ENG	Graham Allen	1	0	0+1	0	0	0	0	0
27	DF	(Republic of Ireland) IRL	Richard Dunne	8	0	6+1	0	1	0	0	0
35	DF	(England) ENG	John Hills	3	0	1+2	0	0	0	0	0
Midfielders
7	MF	(England) ENG	Graham Stuart	38	5	29+6	5	2	0	1	0
10	MF	(Wales) WAL	Gary Speed	41	11	37	9	2	1	2	1
12	MF	(England) ENG	Nick Barmby	29	8	22+3	4	2	1	1+1	3
18	MF	(England) ENG	Joe Parkinson	31	0	28	0	1	0	2	0
20	MF	(England) ENG	Tony Grant	20	0	11+6	0	0+2	0	1	0
Forwards
8	FW	(England) ENG	Paul Rideout	12	1	4+5	0	1	0	1+1	1
9	FW	(Scotland) SCO	Duncan Ferguson	36	11	31+2	10	2	1	1	0
23	FW	(England) ENG	Michael Branch	27	3	13+12	3	1	0	0+1	0
28	FW	(England) ENG	Danny Cadamarteri	1	0	0+1	0	0	0	0	0
Players who left the club during the season
11	MF	(Sweden) SWE	Anders Limpar	3	0	1+1	0	0	0	1	0
14	MF	(England) ENG	John Ebbrell	8	0	7	0	0	0	1	0
17	MF	(Russia) RUS	Andrei Kanchelskis	24	6	20	4	2	1	2	1
