= Matthew McKay =

Matt or Matthew McKay may refer to:

- Matthew McKay (politician) (1858–1937)
- Matt McKay (born 1983), Australian football player
- Matthew McKay (psychologist), founder of New Harbinger Publications
- Matt McKay (English footballer) (born 1981), footballer for Chester City
- Matthew McKay (American football) (born 1999), American football player

== See also ==
- Matthew MacKay, Canadian politician
