= Jon O'Connor =

English footballer (born 1976)

Personal information
- Full name: Jonathan O'Connor
- Date of birth: 29 October 1976 (age 50)
- Place of birth: Darlington, England
- Height: 5 ft 10 in (1.78 m)
- Positions: Centre back; right back

Youth career
- 1993–1995: Everton

Senior career*
Years	Team	Apps	(Gls)
1995–1998	Everton	5	(0)
1998	→ Sheffield United (loan)	0	(0)
1998–2000	Sheffield United	4	(0)
2000–2002	Blackpool	11	(0)
Total		20	(0)

International career
1992–1993	England U16	11	(0)
1993–1995	England U18	11	(0)
1996	England U21	3	(0)
- * Club domestic league appearances and goals

Jonathan O'Connor (born 29 October 1976) is an English former footballer who played as a defender in the Premier League for Everton and in the Football League for Sheffield United and Blackpool. Internationally, he represented England at levels up under-21.

== Club career ==
O'Connor was born in 1976 in Darlington, County Durham. At 14, he was accepted into the Football Association's National School of Excellence at Lilleshall, and went on to join Everton (in preference to Leeds United and Barnsley) as a trainee. Manager Joe Royle had been impressed by his temperament. He signed his first professional contract in October 1993, and made his first-team debut in February 1996 against Manchester United at Old Trafford playing out of position at right back. Although Everton lost 2–0, O'Connor made a good impression. In his column in the Liverpool Echo, Everton's goalkeeper, Neville Southall, wrote that "facing Ryan Giggs on your debut is about as tough as it can get", but that O'Connor was not daunted and played very positively. He kept his place for the next two matches – two wins, no goals conceded – and was then replaced by the newly arrived Swiss international right back Marc Hottiger. O'Connor's 89th-minute appearance as a substitute in that match was his last of the season.

A groin problem worsened after he played at the Toulon Tournament, and he had a hernia operation in pre-season, followed by a thigh injury which meant he played no first-team football in 1996–97. He signed a three-year contract in February 1997, but by the end of the season, Royle had been replaced by Howard Kendall. Now fit but not in the team, O'Connor attracted offers from teams wanting to take him on loan, but Kendall felt unable to let him leave. In November, he came off the bench for 15 minutes against Aston Villa, but when another vacancy arose, against Chelsea in January 1998, Graham Allen was preferred.

In early February, he joined First Division club Sheffield United on loan, but before he could take the field, the move was made permanent. O'Connor was valued at an estimated £250,000 in a part-exchange deal that reunited Kendall with Don Hutchison. He made his debut the next day, as an 89th-minute substitute against Bradford City, and appeared just once more for the first team that season, again from the bench. He was part of the reserve team that won the 1998 Central League Cup, but his time at the club was disrupted by injury. He played twice in the league in December 1998, and his sole appearance in that season's FA Cup was his last for Sheffield United's first team.

After a string of trials with clubs including Chester City, Scunthorpe United, Cambridge United, Darlington, Hartlepool United, and Lincoln City, O'Connor signed for Third Division club Blackpool in October 2000. He played regularly for a couple of months, and made 14 first-team appearances in the 2000–01 season, but eventually retired due to "persistent glandular fever problems."

== International career ==
O'Connor made eleven appearances for England at under-16 level in 1992 and 1993, and captained the side. He moved up to the under-18s, and played in qualifiers for three consecutive editions of the European Championships. England reached the finals in the first of the three, in 1993, but O'Connor was not selected in the squad for the tournament. He received his first call-up for the under-21 team in April 1996 for a warm-up match against Croatia at Roker Park, Sunderland, ahead of the 1996 Toulon Tournament. He started against Croatia, and was named in the squad for Toulon, where he played in two of the four group matches.

== Career statistics ==
Appearances and goals by club, season and competition
Club	Season	League			FA Cup		League Cup		Other		Total	
Club	Season	Division	Apps	Goals	Apps	Goals	Apps	Goals	Apps	Goals	Apps	Goals
Everton	1995–96	Premier League	4	0	0	0	0	0	0	0	4	0
Everton	1996–97	Premier League	0	0	0	0	0	0	—		0	0
Everton	1997–98	Premier League	1	0	0	0	0	0	—		1	0
Everton	Total		5	0	0	0	0	0	0	0	5	0
Sheffield United	1997–98	First Division	2	0	0	0	—		0	0	2	0
Sheffield United	1998–99	First Division	2	0	1	0	0	0	—		3	0
Sheffield United	1999–2000	First Division	0	0	0	0	0	0	—		0	0
Sheffield United	Total		4	0	1	0	0	0	0	0	5	0
Blackpool	2000–01	Third Division	11	0	2	0	—		1 (Note: Appearance in Football League Trophy)	0	14	0
Career total			20	0	3	0	0	0	1	0	24	0
