= Claus Thomsen =

Danish footballer (born 1970)

Personal information
- Date of birth: 31 May 1970 (age 56)
- Place of birth: Aarhus, Denmark
- Height: 1.93 m (6 ft 4 in)
- Position: Defender

Senior career*
Years	Team	Apps	(Gls)
1989–1994	AGF Aarhus	142	(21)
1994–1997	Ipswich Town	81	(7)
1997–1998	Everton	24	(1)
1998	AB	20	(2)
1998–2002	VfL Wolfsburg	54	(3)
Total		321	(34)

International career
1986–1988	Denmark U19	19	(0)
1989–1992	Denmark U21	18	(3)
1995–1999	Denmark	20	(0)
- * Club domestic league appearances and goals

Claus Thomsen (born 31 May 1970) is a Danish former professional footballer. He won the Danish Cup with AGF Aarhus and played in England for top level teams Ipswich Town and Everton, as well as Wolfsburg in Germany. He played 20 matches for the Danish national team, and represented Denmark at the 1992 Summer Olympics and 1996 European Championship.

== Life and career ==
Born in Aarhus, Thomsen started his career at local top-flight club AGF Aarhus, where he initially played as a midfielder. Thomsen made his debut for the Danish under-21 national team in May 1989, where under-21 national team coach Richard Møller Nielsen used the 6' 3" Thomsen as a central defender. Thomsen was named under-21 national team captain in 1990. In December 1990, Thomsen signed a new contract with AGF, rejecting interest from Brøndby IF and B1903.

In November 1991, Thomsen was scouted by Celtic FC manager Liam Brady, but the deal fell through due to "too many intermediaries" according to Claus Thomsen himself. He was injured in an under-21 national game against Poland in March 1992, but recovered in time to help AGF win the 1992 Danish Cup. He also captained Denmark at the 1992 Summer Olympics, where he played all three of Denmark's matches, and scored a goal against Mexico. In the fall of 1992, he lost his place in the central defence in AGF's starting line-up, and he was used in a number of different positions. He went on trial at Werder Bremen in December 1992, but was not signed by Werder manager Otto Rehhagel.

=== Ipswich Town ===
In June 1994, he moved abroad to play for English club Ipswich Town, in a transfer deal worth £250,000. He was called up for his Danish national team début, by national coach Richard Møller Nielsen, in April 1995. Thomsen was also called up to the Danish national squad for the 1996 European Championship, and played in all of Denmark's three matches before elimination. He made a total 97 appearances and scored 8 goals for Ipswich, and was one of the stronger players in the weakest side in Ipswich Town's history. In his first season, he was relegated with Ipswich in 1994/95, and was a key player in the team that missed out on the First Division play-offs in 1995–96; however, as Ipswich were looking to improve their side, he was sold to Everton, for £900,000, in January 1997.

=== Everton ===
At Everton, Thomsen notably scored an own goal in the Merseyside derby at Goodison Park on 16 April 1997, meaning that Everton were held to a 1–1 draw by Liverpool, although they still achieved Premier League survival in 15th place. He scored once at the right end for Everton, his side's only goal in a 2–1 defeat to Derby County.

=== Akademisk Boldklub ===
After little more than a year at Everton, marred by poor performances, he moved back to Denmark for £500,000 in March 1998, to play for Akademisk Boldklub (AB). He stayed at AB for six months, before moving abroad once again.

=== VfL Wolfsburg ===
Thomsen joined German club VfL Wolfsburg in September 1998. In April 1999, he ended his Danish national team career, citing a lacking energy surplus. Struggling with injuries, he remained at Wolfsburg for four years, but saw little playing time during this period, retiring in April 2002.

== Career statistics ==
Appearances and goals by club, season and competition
Club	Season	League			National Cup		League Cup		Other		Total	
Club	Season	Division	Apps	Goals	Apps	Goals	Apps	Goals	Apps	Goals	Apps	Goals
AGF Aarhus
AGF Aarhus	1988	Danish 1st Division	5	1	0	0	—		—		5	1
AGF Aarhus	1989	Danish 1st Division	23	6	0	0	—		2 (Note: Appearances in UEFA Cup Winners' Cup)	0	25	6
AGF Aarhus	1990	Danish 1st Division	25	5	0	0	—		—		25	5
AGF Aarhus	1991	Danish Superliga	18	1	0	0	—		—		18	1
AGF Aarhus	1991–92	Danish Superliga	22	0	0	0	—		—		22	0
AGF Aarhus	1992–93	Danish Superliga	29	5	0	0	—		2	0	29	5
AGF Aarhus	1993–94	Danish Superliga	20	3	0	0	—		—		20	3
AGF Aarhus	Total		142	21	0	0	0	0	4	0	146	21
Ipswich Town	1994–95	Premier League	33	5	1	0	2	0	—		36	5
Ipswich Town	1995–96	First Division	37	2	3	0	2	1	3 (Note: Appearances in Anglo-Italian Cup)	0	45	3
Ipswich Town	1996–97	First Division	11	0	1	0	4	0	—		16	0
Ipswich Town	Total		81	7	5	0	8	1	3	0	97	8
Everton	1996–97	Premier League	16	0	0	0	0	0	0	0	16	0
Everton	1997–98	Premier League	8	1	1	0	0	0	0	0	9	1
Everton	Total		24	1	1	0	0	0	0	0	25	1
AB	1997–98	Danish Superliga	12	1	0	0	—		0	0	12	1
AB	1998–99	Danish Superliga	8	1	0	0	—		0	0	8	1
AB	Total		20	2	0	0	0	0	0	0	20	2
VfL Wolfsburg	1998–99	Bundesliga	26	2	4	0	—		—		30	2
VfL Wolfsburg	1999–00	Bundesliga	24	0	2	1	—		6 (Note: Appearances in UEFA Cup)	0	26	1
VfL Wolfsburg	2000–01	Bundesliga	4	1	2	0	—		4 (Note: Appearances in UEFA Intertoto Cup)	0	26	1
VfL Wolfsburg	Total		54	3	8	1	0	0	10	0	72	4
Career total			321	34	14	1	8	1	17	0	360	36

=== International ===
Appearances and goals by national team and year
National team	Year	Apps	Goals
Denmark
Denmark	1995	3	0
Denmark	1996	9	0
Denmark	1997	4	0
Denmark	1998	2	0
Denmark	1999	2	0
Total		20	0

== Honours ==
AGF Aarhus

- Danish Cup: 1991–92
