= Michael Walsh (footballer, born 1986) =

English footballer

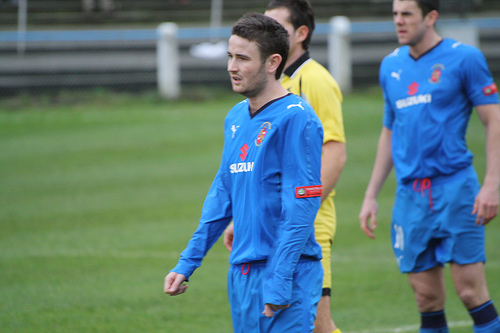

Personal information
- Full name: Michael George Walsh
- Date of birth: 30 May 1986 (age 40)
- Place of birth: Liverpool, England
- Positions: Midfielder; full-back

Youth career
- c. 2002–2004: Rhyl
- 2004–2005: Chester City

Senior career*
| Years | Team | Apps | (Gls) |
| 2005 | Chester City | 5 | (1) |
| 2005 | Rhyl | 0 | (0) |
| 2005–2009 | Bangor City | 93 | (14) |
| 2009–2011 | APOP Kinyras Peyias | | |
| 2011–2012 | Bangor City | 7 | (0) |
| 2012–2013 | Aberystwyth Town | 1 | (0) |
| 2013–2019 | Rhyl | | |
| 2019–2020 | St Asaph City | | |
| 2020 | Holywell Town | | |
| 2020–? | Rhyl 1879 | | |
- * Club domestic league appearances and goals

Michael Walsh (born 30 May 1986) is an English footballer.

== Career ==
Walsh was born in Liverpool. He joined Chester from Rhyl in 2004, making his first-team debut the following January as a substitute in an FA Cup tie at AFC Bournemouth in the left back slot. Walsh joined fellow youngsters Robbie Booth, Gavin Lynch and Shaun Whalley in being given first-team opportunities under Ian Rush. His Football League debut followed, again as a substitute at Cambridge United a week later, with his first goal arriving in a 2–2 draw against Southend United on 5 March 2005.

Despite his involvement in the first-team squad, Walsh and the majority of his teammates were released at the end of the season. He spent time on trial with Wrexham and briefly returned to Rhyl before joining Bangor City in September 2005.

He followed this with a two-year spell with Marfin Laiki League side APOP Kinyras Peyias. In 2011, he returned to Wales, rejoining Bangor City before moving to Aberystwyth Town in January 2012. He then moved to Rhyl.

In August 2019 he moved to St Asaph City.

In January 2020 he joined Holywell Town.

In September 2020 he joined Rhyl 1879.

As a youngster, Walsh captained the North Wales under 18s side.
