= Danny Cadamarteri =

English footballer

Personal information
- Full name: Daniel Leon Cadamarteri
- Date of birth: 12 October 1979 (age 47)
- Place of birth: Bradford, England
- Height: 1.75 m (5 ft 9 in)
- Position: Forward

Youth career
- ?–1996: Everton

Senior career*
Years	Team	Apps	(Gls)
1996–2002	Everton	93	(13)
1999	→ Fulham (loan)	5	(1)
2002–2004	Bradford City	52	(5)
2004	Leeds United	0	(0)
2004–2005	Sheffield United	21	(1)
2005–2006	Bradford City	39	(2)
2006	Grays Athletic	1	(0)
2006–2007	Leicester City	9	(0)
2007	→ Doncaster Rovers (loan)	6	(1)
2007–2009	Huddersfield Town	44	(5)
2009–2011	Dundee United	31	(4)
2011–2012	Huddersfield Town	26	(3)
2012–2014	Carlisle United	25	(2)
Total		352	(37)

International career
1997–1998	England U18	5	(0)
1998–2001	England U21	3	(0)
- * Club domestic league appearances and goals

Daniel Leon Cadamarteri (born 12 October 1979) is an English former professional footballer who played in the Football League for clubs including Everton, Bradford City, Huddersfield Town, Leeds United, Leicester City and Carlisle United before retiring in April 2014. He also played non-league football for Grays Athletic and in the Scottish Premier League for Dundee United.

Early in his career, he played three times for the England national under-21 football team.

== Club career ==
=== Everton ===
Cadamarteri was born in Cleckheaton, West Yorkshire, to an English mother of Italian descent and a Jamaican father. Cadamarteri was a product of the Everton Academy and made his debut as a substitute at the end of the 1996–97 season, in a 2–1 defeat against Chelsea. Cadamarteri began the next season as a regular and scored four league goals in the first three months of the season, including one in the Merseyside derby against Liverpool. That goal – in October – was his last in the 1997–98 season, although he featured regularly throughout the campaign. Cadamarteri featured prominently during the following season, again netting four goals. He went on loan to Fulham in November 1999, scoring on his debut against Stockport County.

In June 2001, Cadamarteri appeared in court on a charge of assault, admitting in September he was "ashamed" about the incident. He was found guilty and fined £2,000, with Everton subsequently announcing he was free to leave Goodison Park. Despite interest from First Division clubs Stoke City and Bradford City, Cadamarteri remained at Everton and featured as a late substitute in November, starting a further two matches in January.

=== Bradford City ===
In February 2002, Cadamarteri left Everton to join Bradford City on loan, making the move permanent after scoring on his debut. Featuring in most of the remaining games that season, he only scored one more goal, netting in late April. After receiving community service in July for admitting conspiracy to pervert the course of justice in his previous court case, Cadamarteri failed to score a league goal during the 2002–03 season, with a contract dispute adding to a frustrating season.

=== Later career ===
After scoring three league goals during the following season, Cadamarteri began the 2004–05 season with Leeds United, agreeing a move in June 2004. Appearing in only a League Cup match, the winger moved to Sheffield United in September, scoring once against Crewe Alexandra before injury ended his season in March. At the end of the season, Cadamarteri made a return to Bradford, where – despite featuring regularly – he scored just two league goals.

After incurring a six-month drugs ban and subsequently being released in the summer, Cadamarteri had a trial with Barnsley before signing for Conference National side Grays Athletic in December on non-contract terms. At the end of December, Cadamarteri signed a six-month deal with Leicester City, scoring once against Fulham in the FA Cup before joining Doncaster Rovers on loan, scoring once against Brighton & Hove Albion. He was released by Leicester in May 2007 after his contract was not renewed.

=== Huddersfield Town ===
Cadamarteri signed for Huddersfield Town on 1 June 2007. Most of his Town career was hampered by injury, with the forward making no more than a dozen league appearances in his first season at the West Yorkshire side scoring three goals over the course of the season. The 2008–09 season saw Cadamarteri feature regularly, playing over thirty league matches throughout the season, though most of his games during the 2008–09 season came when playing on the wing as opposed to his more regular position as a forward, finishing the season with two goals to his name, both coming in the league. During April 2009, it was revealed that Cadamarteri had rejected a new contract at Huddersfield, due to the terms in the contract, which only gave him the option of a second year, dependent on appearances.

=== Dundee United ===
In May, Cadamarteri agreed a pre-contract deal with Scottish Premier League side Dundee United, reuniting him with Craig Levein, who managed him at Leicester. He scored twice on his competitive debut in the 2–0 win against Heart of Midlothian on 17 August 2009 and scored again in the following home match, winning the August Player of the Month award.

Cadamarteri played in the 2009-10 Scottish Cup semi-final 2-0 win versus Raith Rovers at Hampden Park. He was an unused substitute as Dundee United won the 2010 Scottish Cup Final. On 27 January 2011, Cadamarteri was released by mutual consent at Dundee United. He had played 14 games in his second season, all but two of which were as substitute.

=== Return to Huddersfield ===
On 31 January 2011, Cadamarteri returned to Huddersfield Town on a short-term contract. He made his debut in the 4–1 win against Exeter City at St James Park, where he scored two minutes after coming on as a substitute. Although Town missed out on promotion, he proved himself a valuable squad member as an impact substitute. He agreed a one-year contract on 5 July.

He left the club in June 2012, after not being offered a new contract by the manager, Simon Grayson.

=== Carlisle United ===
On 21 June 2012, Cadamarteri signed a two-year deal with Carlisle United. In 2014, he retired due to a knee injury.

== International career ==
Cadamarteri was capped three times by the England under-21 team. He made his debut on 17 November 1998 in a friendly match as a substitute against Czech Republic at Portman Road. His second appearance was over a year later on 29 March 2000, again as a substitute, against Yugoslavia. His final appearance for the team was on 24 May 2001 against Mexico.

== Coaching career ==
After his retirement, Cadamarteri worked briefly as a coach with Leeds Ladies F.C., before accepting a position as a coach in Sheffield Wednesday's academy, where he has achieved his UEFA A Licence and his FA Advanced youth award age specific (U17s-U23s).

In July 2017, Cadamarteri was appointed as U18s Professional Development Phase Coach at Burnley. On 5 October 2018, he left his role to 'pursue other coaching opportunities'.

== Personal life ==
His son Bailey is also a footballer for Wrexham as is his younger son, Caelan who plays for Manchester City Under-18.

== Career statistics ==
Appearances and goals by club, season and competition
Club	Season	League			FA Cup		League Cup		Other		Total	
Club	Season	Division	Apps	Goals	Apps	Goals	Apps	Goals	Apps	Goals	Apps	Goals
Everton	1996–97	Premier League	1	0	0	0	0	0	—		1	0
Everton	1997–98	Premier League	26	4	1	0	3	1	—		30	5
Everton	1998–99	Premier League	30	4	4	0	4	0	—		38	4
Everton	1999–2000	Premier League	17	1	2	0	2	1	—		21	2
Everton	2000–01	Premier League	16	4	2	0	0	0	—		18	4
Everton	2001–02	Premier League	3	0	0	0	0	0	—		3	0
Everton	Total		93	13	9	0	9	2	—		111	15
Fulham (loan)	1999–2000	First Division	5	1	—		—		—		5	1
Bradford City	2001–02	First Division	14	2	—		—		—		14	2
Bradford City	2002–03	First Division	20	0	0	0	1	1	—		21	1
Bradford City	2003–04	First Division	18	3	0	0	0	0	—		18	3
Bradford City	Total		52	5	0	0	1	1	—		53	6
Leeds United	2004–05	Championship	0	0	—		1	0	—		1	0
Sheffield United	2004–05	Championship	21	1	1	0	0	0	—		22	1
Bradford City	2005–06	League One	39	2	3	0	1	1	1 (Note: Appearance(s) in Football League Trophy)	0	44	3
Grays Athletic	2006–07	Conference National	1	0	—		—		1 (Note: Appearance(s) in FA Trophy)	1	2	1
Leicester City	2006–07	Championship	9	0	2	1	—		—		11	1
Doncaster Rovers (loan)	2006–07	League One	6	1	—		—		0	0	6	1
Huddersfield Town	2007–08	League One	12	3	2	0	0	0	0	0	14	3
Huddersfield Town	2008–09	League One	32	2	1	0	2	0	1	0	36	2
Huddersfield Town	Total		44	5	3	0	2	0	1	0	50	5
Dundee United	2009–10	Scottish Premier League	21	4	1	0	2	0	—		24	4
Dundee United	2010–11	Scottish Premier League	10	0	1	0	2	0	1 (Note: Appearance(s) in UEFA Europa League)	0	14	0
Dundee United	Total		31	4	2	0	4	0	1	0	38	4
Huddersfield Town	2010–11	League One	11	3	—		—		3 (Note: Two appearances in League One play-offs, one appearance in Football League Trophy)	0	14	3
Huddersfield Town	2011–12	League One	15	0	1	0	0	0	0	0	16	0
Huddersfield Town	Total		26	3	1	0	0	0	3	0	30	3
Carlisle United	2012–13	League One	25	2	1	0	2	0	0	0	28	2
Carlisle United	2013–14	League One	0	0	0	0	0	0	0	0	0	0
Carlisle United	Total		25	2	1	0	2	0	0	0	28	2
Career total			352	37	22	1	20	4	7	1	401	43

== See also ==
- List of doping cases in sport
