= Nick Barmby =

English footballer (born 1974)

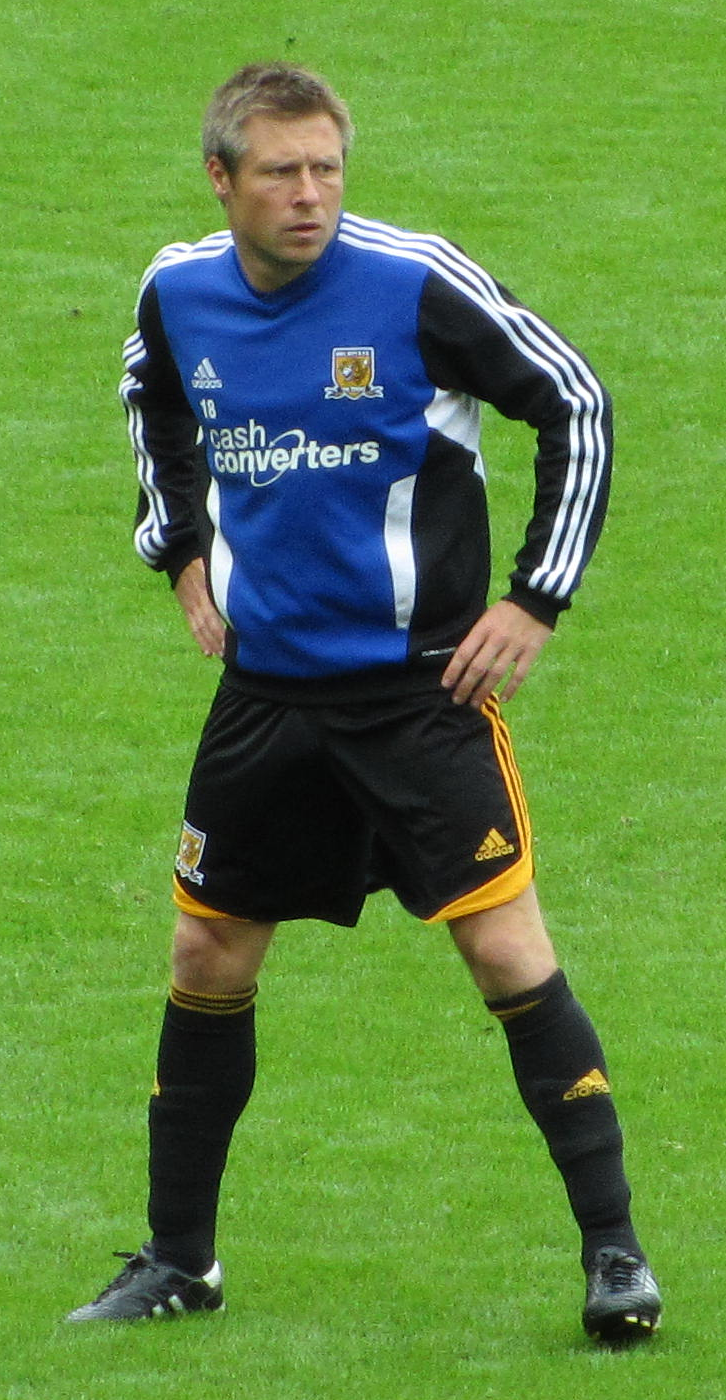
- Barmby training with Hull City in 2011

Personal information
- Full name: Nicholas Jon Barmby
- Date of birth: 11 February 1974 (age 52)
- Place of birth: Hull, England
- Height: 5 ft 7 in (1.70 m)
- Positions: Attacking midfielder; winger

Youth career
- 1990–1992: Tottenham Hotspur

Senior career*
Years	Team	Apps	(Gls)
1992–1995	Tottenham Hotspur	89	(21)
1995–1996	Middlesbrough	42	(8)
1996–2000	Everton	116	(18)
2000–2002	Liverpool	32	(2)
2002–2004	Leeds United	25	(4)
2004	→ Nottingham Forest (loan)	6	(1)
2004–2012	Hull City	180	(26)
Total		490	(80)

International career
1994	England U21	3	(0)
1994–1998	England B	2	(0)
1995–2001	England	23	(4)

Managerial career
- 2011–2012: Hull City
- * Club domestic league appearances and goals

Nicholas Jon Barmby (born 11 February 1974) is an English football coach and former professional player.

As a player, he played as a midfielder spending nearly his entire career in the Premier League for Tottenham Hotspur, Middlesbrough, Everton, Liverpool and Leeds United. He then had a brief spell with Nottingham Forest in the Football League before finishing his career with home town club Hull City where during an eight-year spell he helped the club earn promotion from League One to the Premier League. He was capped 23 times by England between 1995 and 2001, and was part of the Euro 96 and Euro 2000 squads. Barmby is one of only nine players to have scored Premier League goals for six different teams (the others being Nicolas Anelka, Craig Bellamy, Darren Bent, Marcus Bent, Andy Cole, Peter Crouch, Les Ferdinand and Robbie Keane).

Following retirement, Barmby had a spell as Hull City manager, he later had a brief spell as first team coach at Scunthorpe United.

== Club career ==
=== Early career ===
Growing up on the west side of Hull, Barmby played for local teams Springhead and National Tigers as a boy showing talent from a very early age. Consequently, he ended his education at the local Kelvin Hall High School (where he started in 1985) early to complete his studies at The Football Association's School of Excellence, while also honing his skills for the professional game. His father, Jeff Barmby, was also a player in his younger days and became his son's advisor and agent as his skills began to attract the attention of various clubs.

=== Tottenham Hotspur ===
Barmby eventually signed for Tottenham Hotspur, joining them on leaving school in the summer of 1990. His first game for Tottenham was against Hull City at Boothferry Park in a testimonial match for Garreth Roberts, and he scored two goals.

Having turned professional in April 1991 under the management of Terry Venables, he made his competitive debut against Sheffield Wednesday on 27 September 1992 in the FA Premier League, and established himself as a regular player that season, when still only 18 years old.

During his time at the club he became one of Ossie Ardiles' five-man attack, along with Jürgen Klinsmann, Teddy Sheringham, Darren Anderton and Ilie Dumitrescu. He played 100 games and scored 27 goals in all competitions for Spurs, playing on the losing side in two FA Cup semi-finals, before becoming Middlesbrough's most expensive signing in a £5.25 million deal in June 1995.

=== Middlesbrough ===
Barmby set up the first competitive goal at the new Riverside Stadium for Craig Hignett. Barmby stayed at Middlesbrough for 17 months, before heading to Everton, who paid a record fee of £5.75 million for him, a small profit on the price they paid for him.

=== Everton ===
In his first season at the club, Barmby and his new team found themselves in a Premier League relegation battle. However, they survived with a 15th-place finish as Barmby made 25 league appearances and scored four goals. He managed just two goals from 30 appearances the following season as Everton finished just one place above relegation. Injuries restricted him to appearing in just 24 out of 38 league appearances in 1998–99, as he scored three goals. His final season at Goodison Park saw him miss just one league game and find the net nine times, though Everton finished only in 13th place. On 26 February 2000, Barmby scored a hat-trick in a 4–0 win against West Ham United.

After nearly four years at Everton, during which Barmby played 114 league games and scored 18 goals, he headed across Stanley Park to Liverpool for a fee of £6 million on 19 July 2000. It was the first time since striker Dave Hickson in 1959 that Everton had sold a player to Liverpool – although six players had moved in the opposite direction in the 41 years between Barmby's transfer and that of Hickson.

Manchester United also expressed an interest in signing Barmby to cover for their missing players at the start of the 2000–01 season, but they were eventually outbid.

=== Liverpool ===
Barmby was involved in Liverpool's successful season of 2000–01 in which they won the FA Cup, League Cup and UEFA Cup. He scored against his previous club Everton in the Merseyside derby in October 2000, and scored a penalty kick in the shootout against Birmingham City in the League Cup Final. An injury picked up in the FA Cup semi-final in April put his participation in the FA Cup and UEFA Cup finals in doubt. In the end he was left out of the FA Cup final squad but was on the bench for the UEFA Cup Final. The following season he started as Liverpool won the 2001 FA Charity Shield. However after persistent injury and lack of form blighted his second season at the club, Barmby was sold to Leeds United in August 2002 for a fee of £2.75 million, where he linked up with Terry Venables, his first manager at Tottenham. Barmby scored eight goals in his time at Liverpool, all of which came in the 2000–01 season: four in the UEFA Cup, two in the League, and one each in the FA Cup and the League Cup.

=== Leeds United ===
On 8 August 2002, Barmby signed for Leeds for £2.75 million. Despite scoring on his debut, Barmby made little impact at a Leeds side quickly sliding down the Premier League table, and missed much of the action during his two seasons with them in the Premier League. He spent a loan spell at Nottingham Forest during the 2003–04 season, scoring once against Gillingham, before moving to his hometown club, Hull City.

=== Hull City ===
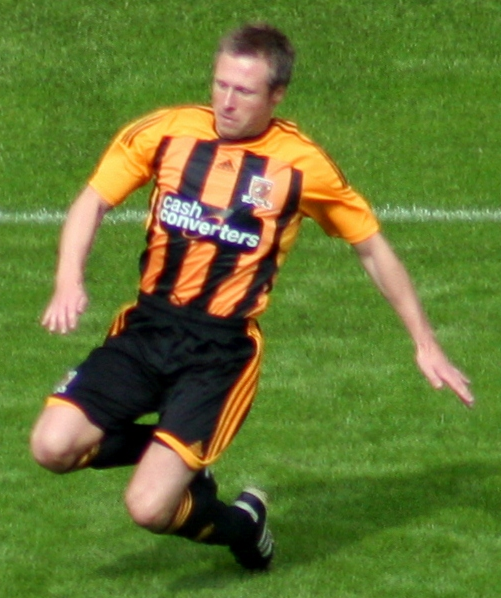
Barmby playing for Hull City in 2011

In 2004, Barmby returned to his hometown team Hull City on a free transfer following Leeds's relegation from the top flight. Barmby helped City to promotion from League One in his first season at the club. He scored nine goals, including the fastest goal in City's history, after seven seconds in a match against Walsall on 6 November 2004. He played for Hull in the 2007–08 Football League Championship campaign, which ended in promotion through the Championship play-offs to the Premier League; a season earlier they had come close to being relegated to League One. 2008–09 was the first season in which Hull City played top division football. He scored his first goal of Hull's first Premier League season against Sunderland on 20 December 2008, making him one of only five players to have scored for six different teams in the Premier League.

On 29 June 2010, it was announced by the incoming Hull City manager, Nigel Pearson, that Barmby would take his first steps into coaching, by being taken onto Pearson's staff at Hull City for the 2010–11 Championship campaign, combining the role of coach with his playing duties.

== International career ==
Barmby earned his first cap for England on 29 March 1995, coming on as a 64th-minute substitute in the 0–0 friendly draw against Uruguay at Wembley Stadium. He made his first start on 6 September, playing the whole game in the 0–0 draw with Colombia. On 23 May 1996, Barmby scored his first goals for England when he netted two goals in the 3–0 win against China at the Workers Stadium in Beijing. These goals ultimately sealed his place in England manager Terry Venables' 22-man squad for Euro 1996. Barmby went on to make three substitute appearances in the tournament, featuring in the 1–1 draw with Switzerland in the opening group game, in the 4–1 win against the Netherlands in the final group game, and in the 0–0 draw against Spain in the quarter-finals, a game England won on penalties. Had the shoot-out against Spain continued into sudden-death kicks, Barmby had been chosen to take England's sixth penalty.

Barmby scored the first goal of Glenn Hoddle's England tenure, he netted the opening goal in the 3–0 win against Moldova during qualification for the 1998 FIFA World Cup. This turned out to be his last cap for nearly four years.

Kevin Keegan recalled Barmby in May 2000 and named him in the preliminary squad for Euro 2000. He featured in the three warm-up games against Brazil, Ukraine, and Malta, before being named in the final squad on 1 June. Barmby made substitute appearances in the games against Germany and Romania as England were eliminated in the group stages.

Barmby scored England's first goal under Sven-Göran Eriksson with the opening goal in a 3–0 friendly win against Spain at Villa Park. On 1 September 2001, he started in the 5–1 thrashing of rivals Germany during qualification for the 2002 World Cup. Barmby started in the 2–2 draw with Greece in October 2001, the result secured England's qualification to the World Cup. This turned out to be his last cap for his country. He won a total of 23 caps for England and scored four goals.

== Coaching career ==
=== Hull City ===
After Pearson left Hull for Leicester on 15 November 2011, Barmby took over as player caretaker manager. His reign got off to a fine start against Derby County by defeating them 2–0 at Pride Park Stadium. He announced his retirement from playing on 6 January 2012 before being appointed manager permanently on 10 January.

It was reported on 8 May 2012 that Barmby had been sacked as manager following a disciplinary meeting with the owners. This was later confirmed after he made comments about the owners and transfer money. He has since lost his appeal.

=== Scunthorpe United ===
On 29 March 2019, Scunthorpe United announced that Barmby would join former Hull City teammate Andy Dawson as a coach. Their first game in charge was against AFC Wimbledon which they lost 2–1. He left the club on 13 May 2019, when new manager Paul Hurst was hired.

== Personal life ==
Barmby has a wife, Mandy, and two sons, Jack and George. Jack Barmby signed for Manchester United, before being signed by Leicester City in 2014. He moved on loan to the Portland Timbers of the MLS in March 2016. He has also represented England below senior level.

Barmby is a fan of Super League side Hull FC.

On 29 December 2023, Barmby was announced as the next member of Hull City's Hall of Fame and would be inducted at the first home league game of 2024 against Norwich City.

== Career statistics ==
=== Club ===
Appearances and goals by club, season and competition
Club	Season	League			FA Cup		League Cup		Continental		Other		Total	
Club	Season	Division	Apps	Goals	Apps	Goals	Apps	Goals	Apps	Goals	Apps	Goals	Apps	Goals
Tottenham Hotspur	1992–93	Premier League	22	6	4	3	3	0	–		–		29	9
Tottenham Hotspur	1993–94	Premier League	27	6	3	1	3	1	–		–		33	8
Tottenham Hotspur	1994–95	Premier League	38	9	6	1	2	1	–		–		46	11
Tottenham Hotspur	Total		87	21	13	5	8	2	0	0	0	0	108	28
Middlesbrough	1995–96	Premier League	32	7	3	1	4	1	–		–		39	9
Middlesbrough	1996–97	Premier League	10	1	–		0	0	–		–		10	1
Middlesbrough	Total		42	8	3	1	4	1	0	0	0	0	49	10
Everton	1996–97	Premier League	25	4	2	1	–		–		–		27	5
Everton	1997–98	Premier League	30	2	1	0	1	3	–		–		32	5
Everton	1998–99	Premier League	24	3	4	1	2	0	–		–		30	4
Everton	1999–2000	Premier League	37	9	5	1	1	0	–		–		43	10
Everton	Total		116	18	12	3	4	3	0	0	0	0	132	24
Liverpool	2000–01	Premier League	26	2	5	1	6	1	9	4	–		46	8
Liverpool	2001–02	Premier League	6	0	–		1	0	4	0	–		11	0
Liverpool	Total		32	2	5	1	7	1	13	4	0	0	57	8
Leeds United	2002–03	Premier League	19	4	2	0	1	0	3	1	–		25	5
Leeds United	2003–04	Premier League	6	0	–		–		–		–		6	0
Leeds United	Total		25	4	2	0	1	0	3	1	0	0	31	5
Nottingham Forest (loan)	2003–04	First Division	6	1	–		–		–		–		6	1
Hull City	2004–05	League One	39	9	2	0	–		–		–		41	9
Hull City	2005–06	Championship	26	5	–		–		–		–		26	5
Hull City	2006–07	Championship	20	4	–		2	1	–		–		22	5
Hull City	2007–08	Championship	15	1	1	0	–		–		3 (Note: Appearances in Championship play-offs)	2	19	3
Hull City	2008–09	Premier League	21	1	3	1	1	0	–		–		25	2
Hull City	2009–10	Premier League	20	0	0	0	2	0	–		–		22	0
Hull City	2010–11	Championship	31	5	1	2	1	0	–		–		33	7
Hull City	2011–12	Championship	8	1	0	0	1	0	–		–		9	1
Hull City	Total		180	26	7	3	7	1	0	0	3	2	197	32
Career total			488	80	42	13	31	8	16	5	3	2	580	108

=== International ===
Appearances and goals by national team and year
National team	Year	Apps	Goals
England	1995	5	0
England	1996	5	3
England	1997	0	0
England	1998	0	0
England	1999	0	0
England	2000	8	0
England	2001	5	1
Total		23	4

Scores and results list England's goal tally first, score column indicates score after each Barmby goal.

List of international goals scored by Nick Barmby
No.	Date	Venue	Cap	Opponent	Score	Result	Competition
1	23 May 1996	Workers Stadium, Beijing, China	6	China	1–0	3–0	Friendly
2	23 May 1996	Workers Stadium, Beijing, China	6	China	2–0	3–0	Friendly
3	1 September 1996	Stadionul Republican, Chișinău, Moldova	10	Moldova	1–0	3–0	1998 FIFA World Cup qualification
4	28 February 2001	Villa Park, Birmingham, England	19	Spain	1–0	3–0	Friendly

== Managerial statistics ==
As of 8 May 2012

Managerial record by team and tenure
Team	From	To	Record				
Team	From	To	P	W	D	L	Win %
Hull City	15 November 2011	8 May 2012	33	13	8	12	39.4
Total			33	13	8	12	39.4

== Honours ==
Liverpool

- Football League Cup: 2000–01
- FA Charity Shield: 2001
- UEFA Cup: 2000–01

Hull City

- Football League One runner-up: 2004–05
- Football League Championship play-offs: 2008
