= John McStay =

Scottish footballer

Jock McStay
Personal information
- Date of birth: 24 December 1965 (age 60)
- Place of birth: Larkhall, Scotland
- Height: 5 ft 11 in (1.80 m)
- Position: Defender

Youth career
- Gartcosh United
- 1982–1984: Motherwell

Senior career*
Years	Team	Apps	(Gls)
1984–1987	Motherwell	20	(1)
1987–1994	Raith Rovers	262	(20)
1994	Falkirk	1	(0)
1994	Hamilton Academical	2	(0)
1994–1995	Clydebank	20	(0)
1995–1997	East Fife	43	(1)
1997	Ayr United	10	(0)
1997–1998	Clyde	35	(5)
1998–2000	Albion Rovers	59	(9)
2000–2003	Glenafton Athletic	?	(?)
Total		452	(36)

Managerial career
- 2000–2015: Glenafton Athletic (player-manager)
- * Club domestic league appearances and goals

John McStay (born 24 December 1965 in Larkhall, South Lanarkshire) is a Scottish former professional footballer who played as a defender. He is a cousin of former Celtic player Paul McStay.

McStay played for nine clubs in a sixteen-year professional career before moving into junior football with Glenafton Athletic in 2000. He went on to become assistant manager to Peter Hetherston at Albion Rovers, one of his former clubs.

He had an on-field altercation with Duncan Ferguson during a Scottish Premier Division encounter between Rangers and Raith Rovers at Ibrox Stadium on 16 April 1994. Ferguson, of Rangers, headbutted McStay, of the visiting Raith, in the south-west corner of the Ibrox pitch. Referee Kenny Clark and his linesmen missed the incident, hence Ferguson avoided a dismissal, but he was subsequently charged with assault and, as it was his fourth such conviction, he was sentenced to three months in prison.

McStay also worked as a painter and decorator, including during breaks in his playing career, and was part of the maintenance department at Celtic Park.

Jock McStay's son, Jonny, is also a footballer who played as a forward for various clubs at Junior level in the 2010s. The same-named player, John McStay, who played for Motherwell and Ayr United in the 2000s, is the son of former player Willie McStay, also a cousin of Jock.
