= Gary Speed =

Welsh footballer and manager (1969–2011)

Gary Speed MBE
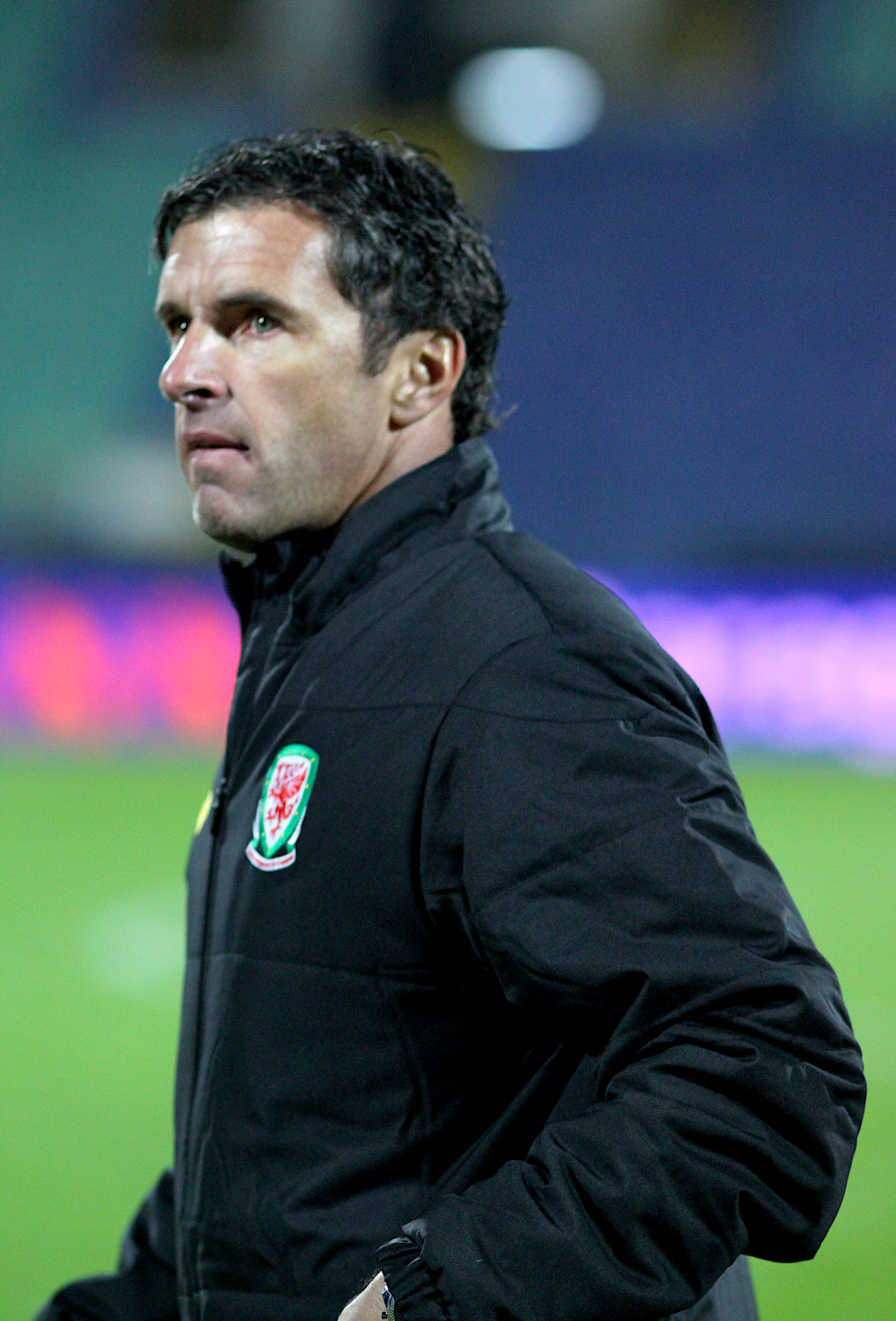
- Speed managing Wales in 2011

Personal information
- Full name: Gary Andrew Speed
- Date of birth: 8 September 1969
- Place of birth: Mancot, Flintshire, Wales
- Date of death: 27 November 2011 (aged 42)
- Place of death: Huntington, Cheshire, England
- Height: 5 ft 10 in (1.78 m)
- Position: Midfielder

Youth career
- 1984–1988: Leeds United

Senior career*
Years	Team	Apps	(Gls)
1988–1996	Leeds United	248	(39)
1996–1998	Everton	58	(16)
1998–2004	Newcastle United	213	(29)
2004–2008	Bolton Wanderers	121	(14)
2008–2010	Sheffield United	37	(6)
Total		677	(104)

International career
1990–1991	Wales U21	3	(2)
1990–2004	Wales	85	(7)

Managerial career
- 2010: Sheffield United
- 2010–2011: Wales
- * Club domestic league appearances and goals

Gary Andrew Speed MBE (8 September 1969 – 27 November 2011) was a Welsh professional footballer and manager. As manager of Wales, he was often credited as being the catalyst for the change in fortunes of the national team and as setting the pathway to future successes.

Having played for the Leeds United youth team, Speed began his professional career with the club in 1988. With Leeds, he won the English First Division championship in 1991–92, and later played for Everton, Newcastle United, Bolton Wanderers and Sheffield United. He captained the Wales national football team until retiring from international football in 2004. He was the most capped outfield player for Wales and the second overall with 85 caps between 1990 and 2004 until being overtaken by Chris Gunter in 2018, playing mainly as a left-sided attacking midfielder. Speed was appointed manager of Sheffield United in 2010, but left the club after a few months in December 2010 to manage the Wales national team, remaining in this role until his death 11 months later.

Rarely troubled by injuries or suspensions, he held the record for the most appearances in the Premier League at 535 until it was surpassed by David James. At the time of his death, only James and Ryan Giggs had played in more Premier League matches than Speed. Including appearances in the Football League and cup competitions, he made 840 domestic appearances.

Overall, he made over 1,000 appearances in his career.

== Early life ==
Gary Andrew Speed was born on 8 September 1969 in the Welsh town of Mancot, the son of Carol and Roger Speed. He was the only member of his family born in Mancot; his parents, his sister Lesley, and later his sons Thomas and Edward were all born in the English city of Chester. He attended Hawarden High School. He supported Everton as a youngster. Whilst at school, he delivered newspapers and played football for Flintshire Schoolboys and Aston Park Rangers. As a youngster, he excelled at cricket and football.

== Club career ==
=== Leeds United ===
Speed began his career with Leeds United as a trainee when he left school in June 1988, and was Peter Swan's boot boy, before he signed a professional contract on 13 June 1988. Leeds manager Howard Wilkinson first noticed Speed in a youth team game while the player was playing in a left back position. Under Wilkinson, he made his first team debut aged 19 in a goalless draw against Oldham Athletic in the Football League Second Division. He would go on to play in nine out of the ten outfield positions, although he was predominantly a left-sided player.

He went on to play a key role, playing 41 of a possible 42 games and scoring seven goals, as Leeds won the Football League First Division championship title in 1992, as part of a midfield that also comprised Gordon Strachan, Gary McAllister and David Batty – former Leeds manager Eddie Gray considered it to be one of the greatest midfield line-ups in the modern era. Wilkinson named Speed as the club's player of the season.

In September 1992, Speed was pivotal in Leeds' UEFA Champions League first-round tie against VfB Stuttgart. Stuttgart had won 3–0 at home and looked to be going through already. Speed helped Leeds to a 4–1 victory at Elland Road, scoring one of them with a "superb left-foot volley" which he later described as his best-ever goal. Although Leeds went out of the tie on the away goals rule, the club was later reinstated, for Stuttgart had fielded an ineligible player.

Speed was selected in the PFA Team of the Year for the 1992–93 season.

On 4 October 1995, Speed scored the winning goal as Leeds beat second division side Notts County in the second round of the League Cup. The match had seemed to be going to extra time, but Speed's 90th-minute winning goal kept Leeds from needing a replay to overcome their lower-league opponents.

Speed featured in the 1996 Football League Cup final defeat by Aston Villa. Before transferring to Everton, Speed played in 312 games for Leeds United, scoring 57 goals.

=== Everton ===
A childhood Everton fan, Speed was signed by Joe Royle before the 1996–97 season, for a fee of £3.5 million. He made his debut on 17 August 1996, scoring against Newcastle United. In November of that year, Speed scored a hat-trick – the only one of his career – as Everton beat Southampton 7–1 at Goodison Park. Speed finished the season with 11 goals, joint top-scorer with Duncan Ferguson. Speed was also voted Everton Player of Year for his performances during his first season at the club.

Howard Kendall succeeded Royle as the manager at the start of the 1997–98 season, and nominated Speed as club captain. However, by the turn of the year the relationship between Speed and Kendall had soured. Speed played his last game for the club on 18 January 1998, scoring in a 3–1 win over Chelsea. He did not travel for their next game, away to West Ham United, and was subsequently sold to Newcastle for £5.5 million. The reasons underlying Speed's departure were never revealed. He told the Liverpool Echo: "You know why I'm leaving, but I can't explain myself publicly because it would damage the good name of Everton Football Club and I'm not prepared to do that."

=== Newcastle United ===
Speed was signed for Newcastle United on 6 February 1998 by Kenny Dalglish, for a fee of £5.5 million. He made his debut as a starter in a 1–0 home Premier League defeat to West Ham United the next day. His first goal came in his fifth match, the sixth round proper of the 1997–98 FA Cup. At home to Barnsley, he scored the second goal of a 3–1 home win with a 27th-minute strike. His only league goal of the 1997–98 season came in a 3–1 home win over Chelsea in the penultimate league match on 2 May, with Newcastle's third in the 59th minute. He finished the season by playing the 1998 FA Cup Final, which Newcastle lost 2–0 to Arsenal on 16 May.

Speed featured in the club's FA Cup Final defeat to Manchester United on 22 May 1999. On 19 September 1999, he scored a goal in Newcastle's 8–0 Premier League victory over Sheffield Wednesday in which his teammate Alan Shearer scored a joint-record five times. He also played in the UEFA Champions League with Newcastle in the 2002–03 season, scoring the 58th-minute equaliser in a 2–1 home victory over Dynamo Kyiv in the group stage on 29 October 2002.

=== Bolton Wanderers ===
Speed moved to Bolton Wanderers on a two-year deal in a £750,000 switch from Newcastle United in July 2004. He became the first player to make 500 Premier League appearances when he played in Bolton's 4–0 victory over West Ham United in December 2006.

On 1 May 2007, Speed was named as the first-team coach for Bolton after Sam Allardyce stepped down from his job as manager. However, in October he left the coaching job and returned to being just a player with the club. Conflicting reports of the incident claimed that then manager Sammy Lee relieved him of his duties to concentrate on playing, but Speed, in an interview with the Bolton News, claimed he chose to step down.

Speed scored a header for Bolton against Reading on 25 August 2007, making him, at the time, the only player to have scored in every Premiership season to date. Ryan Giggs later matched this achievement on 20 October 2007, and passed it on 8 February 2009. It had been reported in December 2007 that Speed was a target for Derby County, but it was confirmed on 24 December 2007 that he would join Sheffield United on loan on 1 January 2008, with a view to a permanent move for a fee of about £250,000.

=== Sheffield United ===
Speed made his debut on the day of his transfer, being named in the starting eleven for a 0–0 away draw against Wolverhampton Wanderers on New Year's Day 2008. He played regularly for the rest of the season and deputised as captain when Chris Morgan was unavailable. Having seen his penalty parried, Speed netted the rebound to score his first goal for United in a victory over Coventry City in March of that year. He went on to finish the season on three goals for United, scoring both goals in a 2–1 home victory over Bristol City in the penultimate game of the 2007–08 season. In an interview with BBC Wales on 10 May 2008, Speed hinted that the 2008–09 season may be his last playing before moving into coaching or management but stated that he had not yet made up his mind.

Speed started the next season as a regular fixture in the United midfield, but succumbed to a back injury in November 2008. Despite undergoing surgery to correct the problem he failed to regain his fitness and missed the rest of the season, concentrating instead on a coaching role at the club. In June 2009, he was approached by Swansea City with regards to taking on the managerial role left vacant by Roberto Martínez. He continued training and completed the 2010 London Marathon in aid of the Sir Bobby Robson Foundation, the cancer charity founded by Speed's former Newcastle manager, who had died of the illness in 2009. Speed's finishing time was 3 hours, 49 minutes and 22 seconds.

Speed finally announced his retirement from playing in his 41st year, but agreed to remain at Sheffield United for at least one more season as a coach. Despite this he was again registered as a player and was named on the bench for the first round League Cup game against Hartlepool United at the outset of the following season.

== International career ==
Speed played for Wales at youth level and earned three caps for the under-21 team. He played 85 times for Wales, making him the second highest capped player only behind goalkeeper Neville Southall who made 92 appearances until Speed was surpassed by Chris Gunter in 2018. Speed captained Wales on 44 occasions. His first appearance for the national side had come on 20 May 1990 in a 1–0 friendly win against Costa Rica at Ninian Park as a second-half replacement for Glyn Hodges. He did not score until his 27th cap, a 3–2 away defeat in Moldova in a Euro 1996 qualifier on 12 October 1994. Speed's first appearance as captain was during his 46th cap, a 3–0 away win in Malta on 3 June 1998.

Speed broke the record held by Dean Saunders for most caps by a Welsh outfield player when he won his 76th against Finland in a Euro 2004 qualifier on 10 September 2003. He captained the side to a 1–1 draw. Speed retired from international football in 2004 after the side's 3–2 defeat to Poland in a 2006 World Cup qualifier.

== Playing style and reputation ==
Speed was a versatile player who mainly played as a attacking midfielder but occasionally played in the left midfield, central midfield, and left-back roles . He is remembered for his knack for directing powerful headers towards goal. He possessed tactical awareness, and could both create and score goals. Regularly a captain, his teammates called him an 'inspirational figure' who led by example and demanded the best from those around him.

Sources described him as a "consummate professional" both on and off the field. Described as hardworking and self-critical, he did not display exceptional talent at a young age, and instead developed his technique through extensive training. He had a reputation for fitness and conditioning, adopting an approach to diet and fitness that was uncommon among players of his generation. His fitness allowed him to avoid serious injury and continue playing until age 39, rarely missing a game.

He also had a reputation as a friendly and supportive person, who cared for and took an interest in the lives of the people around him; his 'nice guy' persona made him a popular and well respected figure amongst his peers.

== Managerial career ==
=== Sheffield United ===
With the 2010–11 season only three games old, Sheffield United manager Kevin Blackwell was dismissed with Speed being confirmed as the club's new manager on a three-year contract on 17 August 2010. On 21 October 2010, Speed was given a one-game touchline ban and a £22,000 fine by The Football Association for his unsporting behaviour at the home fixture against Watford on 2 October 2010. On 11 December 2010, Speed was linked with the vacant Wales manager job along with John Hartson, Brian Flynn, Chris Coleman and Lars Lagerbäck. Sheffield United confirmed that they had given Speed permission to talk to the Football Association of Wales over the vacant position. With just four months managerial experience, Speed was confirmed as the new Welsh national team manager on 14 December 2010 succeeding John Toshack who had stepped down in September 2010. Sheffield United released Speed from his contract after compensation was paid by the FAW. Former Welsh national team manager Mark Hughes supported the move to appoint Speed, saying, "He's got a strong personality, he's good with people, (the players) will relate better to Gary than they perhaps did to the previous manager."

=== Wales ===
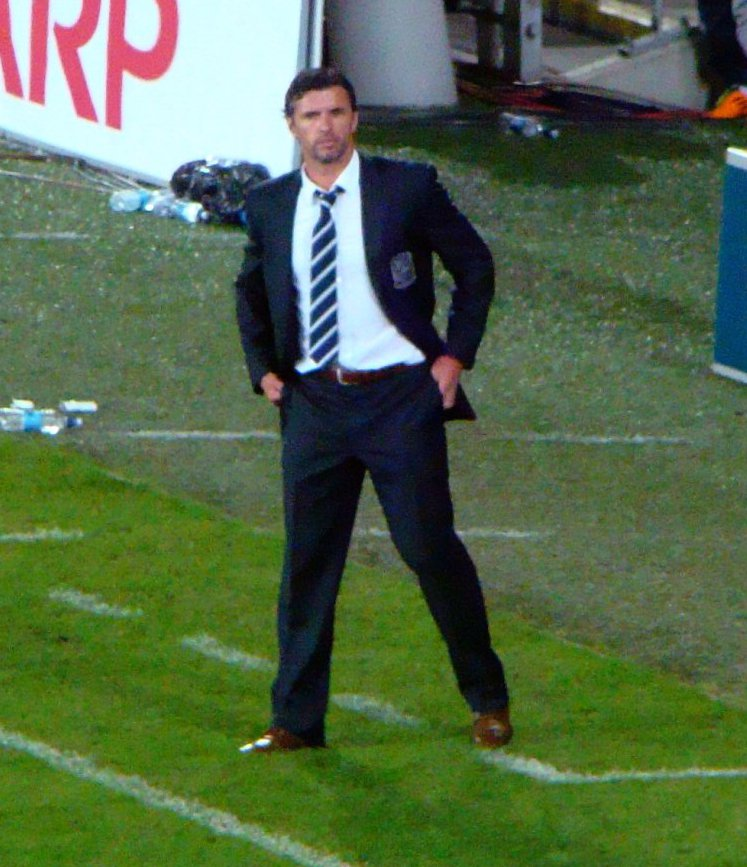
Speed managing Wales in 2011

Speed's first game as Wales manager was 8 February 2011 in the inaugural Nations Cup, which the Republic of Ireland won 3–0. Speed's first competitive match was the Euro 2012 qualifier at home to England on 26 March 2011 and Speed appointed twenty-year-old Aaron Ramsey captain, making Ramsey the youngest ever Wales captain. Wales lost to England 2–0, and in August 2011 Wales attained their lowest ever FIFA ranking of 117th. This was followed by a 2–1 home win against Montenegro, a 1–0 away loss to England, a 2–0 home win against Switzerland and a 1–0 away win against Bulgaria. Consequently, in October 2011, Wales were ranked 45th in the world by FIFA. Speed's last game as manager of Wales was on 12 November 2011, a 4–1 home win in a friendly match against Norway. On 21 December 2011, the day of the final FIFA rankings of the year, Wales were awarded the title of 'Best Movers' of the year having gained more ranking points than any other nation in 2011.

== Personal life ==
Speed married his senior school girlfriend Louise in 1996, and they had two sons. In March 2012, Edward was selected for the Wales Under-16 squad.

He was known by friends as a humble and modest person, a view echoed by David Moyes. Speed supported charity work and campaigned for footballers' rights.

Speed was appointed a Member of the Order of the British Empire (MBE) in the 2010 Birthday Honours for services to football.

== Death and legacy ==
On 26 November 2011, Speed appeared as a guest on the BBC One show Football Focus. Presenter Dan Walker later described him as being in "fine form". After the show finished at 1 p.m., Speed spoke with other pundits at the MediaCity studios in Salford before joining his former Newcastle United teammate Alan Shearer to watch the team play Manchester United at Old Trafford, a short walk from MediaCity. He texted his friend, journalist Bryn Law, at 4 p.m. to joke that the "first snow of the year has fallen in parts of West Yorkshire", referring to Law's greying hair. At 5 p.m. he drove home to Huntington, Cheshire.

The following morning, just before 7 a.m., Speed's wife Louise found him unresponsive in the garage of their home. At 7:08 a.m, she called emergency services; before they arrived, they advised her over the phone to cut the cable with which he had hanged himself and guided her through resuscitation efforts. Police were also informed and confirmed his death at the age of 42, stating that they were not treating it as suspicious. Although the facts were not fully established, it was reported that his death had been a suicide. His death was announced to the public by the Football Association of Wales a few hours later.

An inquest into Speed's death convened on 29 November 2011, but was adjourned until 30 January 2012. The coroner reached a narrative verdict, stating that there was insufficient evidence to determine intent, as Speed may have intended to make a "dramatic gesture" and then "nodded off to sleep". The inquest heard that the pressure of management had put some strain on his marriage, and that he and Louise had argued the night before his death. It was revealed that Shearer told Speed that such arguments were normal in a long‑term relationship, and Louise told the inquest that recent conversations between her and Speed "went on about our future together and how excited he was about our journey together".

Speed left most of his £1.2 million estate to Louise and the remainder to his sons.

Speed had been coached as a child by Barry Bennell, who was later convicted as a serial child sex offender. In February 2018, after Bennell's conviction, an anonymous victim told Al Jazeera that he had also witnessed Speed being abused. Police had interviewed Speed twice during earlier investigations into Bennell, and he said that he had never been harmed; the inquest found no links.

In September 2018, Louise found a 25-year-old letter Speed had written to her at the age of 17, in which he noted being depressed and said he was going to sleep and hoped to "never wake up".

=== Tributes ===
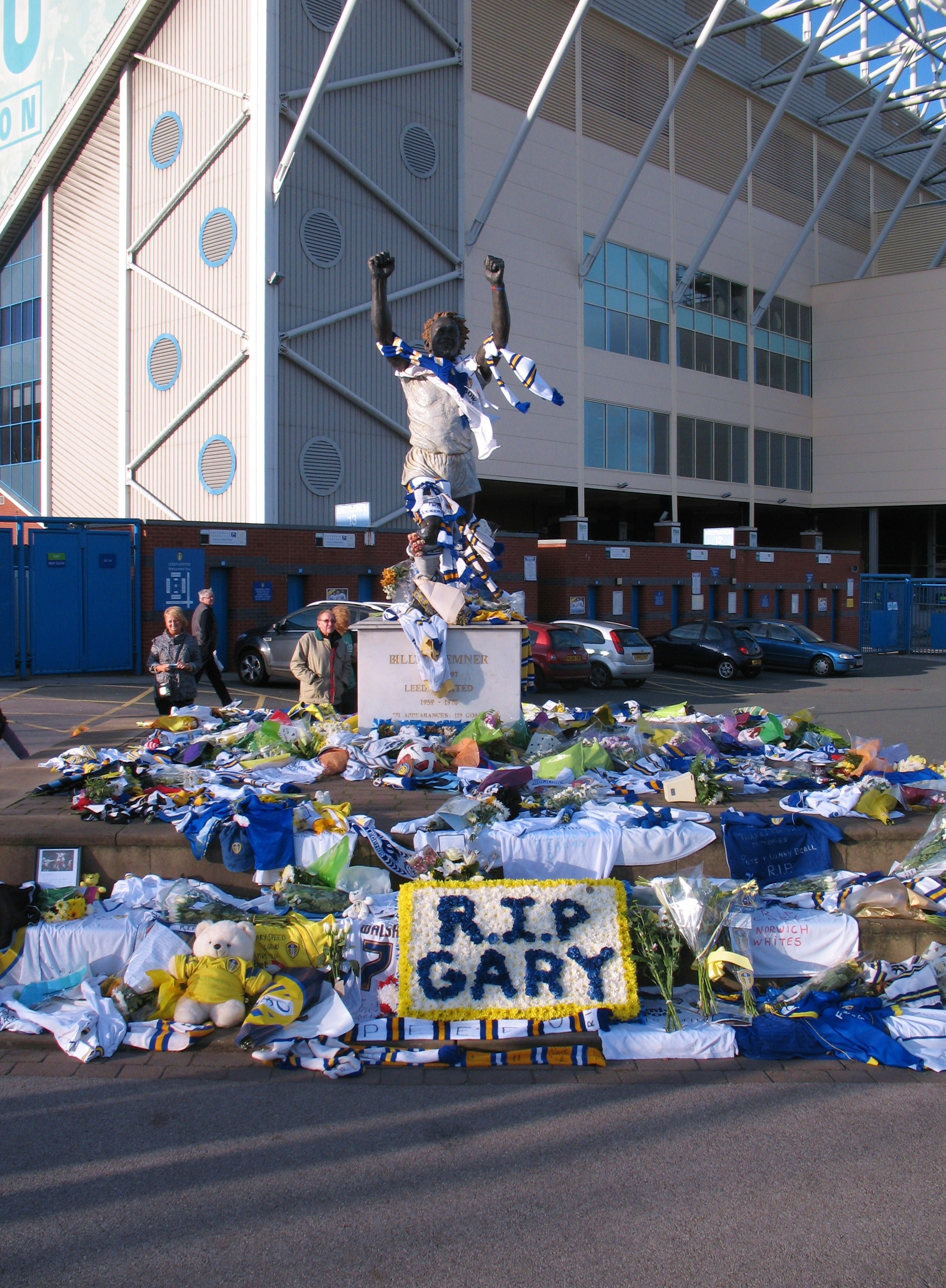
Floral tributes to Gary Speed at Elland Road.

News of Speed's death was first announced by the Football Association of Wales, who extended their sympathies and condolences to Speed's family. Throughout the day similar messages were released from a number of people within football, as well as national figures in Wales and the rest of the United Kingdom. Close friends and former teammates such as Robbie Savage, Ryan Giggs, Simon Grayson, Alan Shearer, Craig Bellamy and John Hartson all expressed their deep sorrow at his death. A number of British politicians expressed sadness at Speed's death and sent condolences to his family, including Prime Minister David Cameron and Leader of the Opposition Ed Miliband. Among the international figures to pay tribute to Speed was UEFA President Michel Platini. FIFA President Sepp Blatter described Speed as "a model professional and a fantastic ambassador for the game". Both the FIFA and Welsh flags at FIFA's headquarters were at half mast as a mark of respect.

The match between Swansea City and Aston Villa at the Liberty Stadium, held only hours after Speed's death was announced, was dedicated to his memory. A minute's silence was to be held before the match. However, the fans applauded instead and sang Speed's name. Several players who played in the match were severely affected by the news. Four Welsh internationals played in the match; Ashley Williams, Neil Taylor and Joe Allen, of Swansea, all played under Speed for Wales, and Allen in particular was said to be struggling with the news. James Collins was the other Welsh international, and he had also played with Speed at international level. Collins' Villa teammates Shay Given and Jermaine Jenas had both played with Speed at Newcastle United, and both were badly affected by the news. Given openly wept during and after the minute's applause. Both managers, Alex McLeish and Brendan Rodgers, paid tribute to Speed. Rodgers, who had spoken to Speed a lot since he had become Wales manager, said that the game had lost a legend, while Neil Taylor said that he hoped Wales could qualify for the 2014 World Cup to honour him.

Along with this match, several others saw tributes toward Speed. The only other Premier League match played that day was between Liverpool and Manchester City. Craig Bellamy of Liverpool was withdrawn from Liverpool's squad by his manager Kenny Dalglish, as he was too affected by the news to play. Bellamy played with Speed for Newcastle United and Wales, where Speed had also been his manager. Dalglish himself had signed Speed for Newcastle, and expressed his sadness at the news, saying that he thought Speed was not only a great footballer but also a great person. Hugo Viana, a Portuguese international who played alongside Speed at Newcastle between 2002 and 2004, also paid tribute to him. After his team Braga had lost 3–2 to Porto, he displayed a shirt reading "Gary, Rest in Peace".

At Sheffield United there were tributes for the former player, coach and manager before the team's home fixture against Torquay United in the FA Cup. Former teammates and colleagues were invited to the match; there was a minute's applause before the match; players warmed up in specially designed shirts; players and coaches wore black armbands; the match day programme was dedicated to Speed; Sheffield United captain Chris Morgan and former Sheffield United and Welsh international Rob Page laid wreaths on pitch side just before kick-off. Sheffield United striker Ched Evans, the only player to be managed by Speed at both club and international level, paid tribute to Speed during the match; Evans revealed a message under his shirt after scoring his first goal which read: "Rest in peace Speedo." Evans stated after the match "I was a man on a mission. I had a message on my top for Gary Speed which I wanted to show. I'm thankful I got the goal ... The crowd started singing [Speed's name], it gave me goose pimples."

During the following week, tributes were paid to Speed from across the football season. A minute's applause was held before the League Cup quarter-final ties, as well as across the Football League midweek matches. Similar events were staged at every Premier League match on the weekend of 4 December, as well as Wales's rugby match against Australia at the Millennium Stadium in Cardiff. Speed's wife Louise and his two children attended the Football League Championship game at Elland Road between Speed's former club Leeds and Millwall, which Leeds won 2–0, and again held a minute's applause. Speed's fellow midfielders from the 1991–92 title-winning side Gary McAllister, David Batty and Gordon Strachan laid wreaths in his memory. Speed's father, Roger, also led a minute's tribute at Goodison Park, where Speed's former club Everton lost 1–0 to Stoke City. Speed's father and sons were again present a week later at the Reebok Stadium, as another of his son's former teams Bolton Wanderers lost 2–1 to Aston Villa.

On 4 January, the Football Association of Wales announced that a match in Speed's memory would be played on 29 February at Cardiff City Stadium. The friendly international against Costa Rica commemorated Speed's debut for Wales, in which Costa Rica were beaten 1–0. The memorial match saw Costa Rica win by the same score.

On 25 September 2012, Everton visited Leeds United in the League Cup. Starting from the 11th minute of the fixture, both sets of supporters chanted Speed's name for 11 minutes.

Beginning in 2022, Leeds fanzine The Square Ball has organised the Gary Speed Walk to support Andy's Man Club, a charity which raises awareness of men's mental health issues. The first walk was a symbolic 92 miles (in honor of the 1991–92 Football League First Division season, where Speed played a major role in Leeds' title win) from his childhood home in Flintshire to Elland Road; Carol Speed, Gary's mother, saw the walkers off. A year later, the walk was another 92 miles to Elland Road, this time starting from Goodison Park in Liverpool in honour of his boyhood club. 2025 saw a third walk, beginning at St James' Park in Newcastle and finishing 121 miles away at Elland Road.

=== Funeral ===
Speed's funeral, attended by around 250 members of his family and close friends, took place in the village of Hawarden on 9 December 2011. In keeping with his wife Louise's wishes, only small crowds gathered on the main road outside St Deiniol's Church and no members of the press were admitted. Speed was later cremated in Pentre Bychan Crematorium, Wrexham.

=== Impact on Welsh football ===
Speed's work to improve the professional standard of the Football Association of Wales, including improvements to training facilities, team culture, and its national visibility, was credited as a major contributor to the success that Wales would enjoy in the decade after his death, beginning with their qualification for Euro 2016 and culminating in their appearance at the 2022 FIFA World Cup in Qatar, bringing to an end a 64-year drought at the World Cup. His memory became part of "the sense of collective purpose" of the organization. On the eve of the Qatar World Cup, Speed's former teammate Neville Southall wrote that the biggest difference between the Welsh squad that had qualified and those that came before started "with a single word: belief," and that "for the initial source of the belief, though, you have to go back to my old mate Gary Speed. Gary had a burning ambition to take Wales into a tournament and, in his time as manager, he made players believe in themselves." Wales captain Gareth Bale paid tribute to Speed on the occasion, saying "Gary Speed's vision was to grow the FAW, not just the football, but the infrastructure: building a training base, having a high-performance centre and recovery centre, just like a top club," adding "I'm sure he's looking down on us with a big smile and happy that Welsh football is in a great place."

== Career statistics ==
=== Club ===
Appearances and goals by club, season and competition
Club	Season	League			FA Cup		League Cup		Other		Total	
Club	Season	Division	Apps	Goals	Apps	Goals	Apps	Goals	Apps	Goals	Apps	Goals
Leeds United	1988–89	Second Division	1	0	0	0	0	0	0	0	1	0
Leeds United	1989–90	Second Division	25	3	0	0	1	0	1 (Note: Appearance(s) in Full Members' Cup)	0	27	3
Leeds United	1990–91	First Division	38	7	6	0	7	3	5	0	56	10
Leeds United	1991–92	First Division	41	7	1	0	4	3	1	0	47	10
Leeds United	1992–93	Premier League	39	7	4	3	3	1	6 (Note: One appearance in FA Charity Shield, five appearances and one goal in UEFA Champions League)	1	52	12
Leeds United	1993–94	Premier League	36	10	2	1	2	1	—		40	12
Leeds United	1994–95	Premier League	39	3	4	0	2	0	—		45	3
Leeds United	1995–96	Premier League	29	2	4	1	7	3	4 (Note: Appearances in UEFA Cup)	1	44	7
Leeds United	Total		248	39	21	5	26	11	17	2	312	57
Everton	1996–97	Premier League	37	9	2	1	2	1	—		41	11
Everton	1997–98	Premier League	21	7	0	0	3	0	—		24	7
Everton	Total		58	16	2	1	5	1	0	0	65	18
Newcastle United	1997–98	Premier League	13	1	4	1	—		—		17	2
Newcastle United	1998–99	Premier League	38	4	6	1	2	0	2 (Note: Appearances in UEFA Cup Winners' Cup)	0	48	5
Newcastle United	1999–2000	Premier League	36	9	6	3	1	0	6	1	49	13
Newcastle United	2000–01	Premier League	35	5	2	0	4	1	—		41	6
Newcastle United	2001–02	Premier League	29	5	2	0	3	0	6 (Note: Appearances in UEFA Intertoto Cup)	2	40	7
Newcastle United	2002–03	Premier League	24	2	0	0	0	0	12 (Note: Appearances in UEFA Champions League)	1	36	3
Newcastle United	2003–04	Premier League	38	3	2	0	1	0	13 (Note: Two appearances in UEFA Champions League, eleven appearances and one goal in UEFA Cup)	1	54	4
Newcastle United	Total		213	29	22	5	11	1	39	5	285	40
Bolton Wanderers	2004–05	Premier League	38	1	2	0	0	0	—		40	1
Bolton Wanderers	2005–06	Premier League	31	4	2	0	2	0	5	0	40	4
Bolton Wanderers	2006–07	Premier League	38	8	2	0	2	0	—		42	8
Bolton Wanderers	2007–08	Premier League	14	1	—		0	0	3	0	17	1
Bolton Wanderers	Total		121	14	6	0	4	0	8	0	139	14
Sheffield United	2007–08	Championship	20	3	2	0	—		—		22	3
Sheffield United	2008–09	Championship	17	3	0	0	1	0	0	0	18	3
Sheffield United	2009–10	Championship	0	0	0	0	0	0	—		0	0
Sheffield United	Total		37	6	2	0	1	0	0	0	40	6
Career total			677	104	53	11	47	13	64	7	841	135

=== International ===
Appearances and goals by national team and year
National team	Year	Apps	Goals
Wales	1990	3	0
Wales	1991	6	0
Wales	1992	8	0
Wales	1993	6	0
Wales	1994	6	1
Wales	1995	4	1
Wales	1996	6	0
Wales	1997	5	1
Wales	1998	5	0
Wales	1999	5	0
Wales	2000	7	1
Wales	2001	5	0
Wales	2002	5	1
Wales	2003	8	1
Wales	2004	6	1
Total		85	7

Scores and results list Wales' goal tally first, score column indicates score after each Speed goal.

List of international goals scored by Gary Speed
No.	Date	Venue	Cap	Opponent	Score	Result	Competition	Ref.
1	12 October 1994	Stadionul Republican, Chișinău, Moldova	27	Moldova	1–0	2–3	UEFA Euro 1996 qualification	
2	6 September 1995	National Stadium, Cardiff, Wales	32	Moldova	1–0	1–0	UEFA Euro 1996 qualification	
3	29 March 1997	National Stadium, Cardiff, Wales	41	Belgium	1–2	1–2	1998 FIFA World Cup qualification	
4	2 September 2000	Dinamo Stadium, Minsk, Belarus	59	Belarus	1–2	1–2	2002 FIFA World Cup qualification	
5	20 November 2002	Tofiq Bahramov Republican Stadium, Baku, Azerbaijan	71	Azerbaijan	1–0	2–0	UEFA Euro 2004 qualification	
6	29 March 2003	Millennium Stadium, Cardiff, Wales	73	Azerbaijan	2–0	4–0	UEFA Euro 2004 qualification	
7	4 September 2004	Tofiq Bahramov Republican Stadium, Baku, Azerbaijan	82	Azerbaijan	1–0	1–1	2006 FIFA World Cup qualification	

== Managerial statistics ==
Managerial record by team and tenure
Team	From	To	Record				
Team	From	To	P	W	D	L	Win %
Sheffield United	17 August 2010	14 December 2010	18	6	3	9	33.3
Wales	14 December 2010	27 November 2011	10	5	0	5	50.0
Total			28	11	3	14	39.3

== Honours ==
=== Player ===
Leeds United

- Football League First Division: 1991–92
- Football League Second Division: 1989–90
- FA Charity Shield: 1992
- Football League Cup runner-up: 1995–96

Newcastle United

- FA Cup runner-up: 1997–98, 1998–99

Individual

- PFA Team of the Year: 1992–93 Premier League
