= Robbie Booth =

English footballer

Personal information
- Full name: Robert Paul Booth
- Date of birth: 30 December 1985 (age 40)
- Place of birth: Liverpool, England
- Positions: Midfielder; striker

Youth career
- 2002–2004: Everton
- 2004: Chester City

Senior career*
Years	Team	Apps	(Gls)
2004–2005	Chester City	11	(1)
2005–2006	Southport	30	(0)
2006	→ Burscough (loan)	7	(3)
2006–2008	Burscough	64	(14)
2008–2010	Southport	57	(4)
2009	→ Vauxhall Motors (loan)	9	(1)
2010	Droylsden	6	(0)
2010–2013	Chester	68	(10)
2012	→ Vauxhall Motors (loan)	4	(1)
2013	Bangor City	11	(1)
2013–2014	AFC Telford United	22	(2)
2014–2015	Warrington Town	16	(2)
2015	Colwyn Bay	19	(3)
2015–2016	Skelmersdale United	6	(0)
- * Club domestic league appearances and goals as of 22:17, 2 January 2024 (UTC)

Robbie Booth (born 30 December 1985) is an English footballer.

== Career ==
Booth was signed by Chester as a youngster from Everton, where he was released in March 2004 along with fellow Chester-bound player Gavin Lynch. He made his first-team debut for Chester in a 2–1 Football League Trophy win at Sheffield Wednesday on 29 September 2004, with his first league appearance being made two months later at home to Oxford United. He netted his first goal against Boston United the following April but he was released along with the majority of the remainder of the squad by new manager Keith Curle at the end of the season.

This remains the last time Booth was contracted to a Football League club, as he joined Southport.

After more than a year playing in the Conference National, Booth joined Burscough in September 2006, following manager Liam Watson, to the Sandgrounders' neighbours. However, with Watson returning to Southport in 2008, Booth did not take long to follow, with confirmation of him re-joining the Conference North side, on 19 July. However, as part of the deal to bring Tony Gray back to Southport, Booth along with Bradley Barnes and Ciaran Kilheeney signed for Droylsden.

In September 2010, Booth signed for the recently reformed Chester. He became the second player after Carl Ruffer to make first team appearances for both Chester City and Chester. After being injured, in November 2012 he joined Vauxhall Motors on loan to regain match fitness. His club debut came on 3 November in a 2–0 home defeat to Brackley Town.

On 26 April 2014 he won promotion to the Conference Premier with Telford after they clinched the Conference North title on the final game of the season.
