= Andy Watson (footballer, born 1978) =

English footballer

Personal information
- Full name: Andrew Watson
- Date of birth: 13 November 1978 (age 47)
- Place of birth: Leeds, England
- Position: Midfielder

Senior career*
Years	Team	Apps	(Gls)
- Garforth Town
1999–2003	Doncaster Rovers		(8)
2003	Tamworth	7	(2)
2003–2004	Farsley Celtic	?	(?)
2004–2005	Chester City	0	(0)
2004–2005	→ Forest Green Rovers (loan)	7	(0)
2005–2012	Farsley Celtic	27	(0)
- * Club domestic league appearances and goals as of 23:07, 6 July 2010 (UTC)

Andrew Watson (born 13 November 1978) is an English footballer who plays as a midfielder.

== Career ==
Watson was born in Leeds, West Yorkshire. He signed for Doncaster Rovers towards the end of the 1998–99 season, a £25,000 buy from Garforth Town. He was in the side that won promotion from the Football Conference in 2003, he has never made a Football League appearance. A move to Chester City a year later was unsuccessful, as he was injured in pre-season and left the club after a solitary Football League Trophy outing.
