= Peter Johnson (businessman) =

British businessman (1939–2024)

- Born: 24 November 1939
- Died: 10 January 2024 (aged 84)
- Occupation: Executive Chairman
- Employer: Park Group PLC
- Known for: Chairman of Everton F.C. and Tranmere Rovers

Peter Robert Johnson (24 November 1939 – 10 January 2024) was a British businessman and football investor, based in Birkenhead.

The son of a butcher, Johnson helped run a family-owned business Park Foods, a supplier of Christmas hampers in the early 1990s. During this time, Johnson was an investor in Tranmere Rovers football club, during which time they rose from the foot of the Football League to the Championship, and was chairman of Everton F.C. until 1999.

After having an estimated fortune of £150 million in the early 1990s, Johnson's fortune dropped to £58 million in 2004.

== Park Foods ==
The son of a butcher, Johnson branched the family butchery business out into a Christmas Savings club in 1967. The Park Hamper Company was formed in 1969, and Park Foods became a weekly cash savings business.

By the early 1990s, Birkenhead based Park Foods had made Johnson one of the UK's richest people, with an estimated fortune of £150 million. At its peak, Park Foods packed 1m Christmas hampers and delivered them to people who had saved up to £5 a week all year. Johnson also became chairman of Nightfreight GB when it went public on the London Stock Exchange in 1993.

In the mid-1990s Johnson branched his interests out into both football and flavoured crisps, after which Park Foods lost £6.2 million in first half of 1997. By Christmas 2004, due partly to competition from supermarkets, Park packed just 75,000. Park Group's cash lending book – where loans are typically £300 – between 2003 and 2004 grew 82% to £24.6 million.

In October 2004, Johnson put the group valued at around £49 million up for sale, after the failure of both the flavoured crisp and door-step loan businesses. Park Group was rebranded Appreciate Group plc in 2019.

== Football ==
=== Tranmere Rovers ===
Johnson was a Liverpool F.C. supporter from boyhood, and a former shareholder. In 1987, Johnson was approached by local football club Tranmere Rovers, to take over running of the club and restore stability, after American Bruce Osterman ran up large debts, and were in danger of losing their league status and potentially going out of business. Johnson took control of the then Fourth Division (fourth tier) club, and they rose to the Third Division in 1989 and then the Second Division in 1991. With Tranmere in the second tier of the English league for the first time since the 1930s, he then also oversaw the signing of former Liverpool striker John Aldridge. Tranmere qualified for the new Division One playoffs three seasons running in the 1990s, but failed to win promotion to the FA Premier League.

Johnson oversaw the conversion of Prenton Park into an all-seater stadium holding more than 16,000 fans by the mid 1990s.

=== Everton ===
Johnson also had a spell as chairman at Everton, which lasted for four years. After Everton avoided relegation in 1994, Johnson agreed to inject £10 million via a rights issue into Everton, as advised by NM Rothschild from a Jersey based family trust.

His ownership of Everton saw the club win the FA Cup in 1995 and finish sixth in Premier League a year later, as well as making expensive signings including Andrei Kanchelskis and Gary Speed, but they also came close to being relegated in 1998.

The Football Association ruled that one person could not own a controlling interest in more than one club. In accordance with this, Johnson agreed to sell shares in one club by 1998, and resultantly appointed his then girlfriend Lorraine Rogers to look after his interests at Tranmere. It was believed that Johnson would sell his shares in Tranmere, and it was speculated by the press on more than one occasion that he had.

On Christmas Eve 1999, Everton Chairman Bill Kenwright struck a deal ahead of other consortia, including one headed by Johnson's rival meat-seller Gerry White, to buy Johnson's 68% controlling stake in Everton for £20 million – thus valuing the club at £30 million.

=== Refocus on Tranmere ===
Upon his return, Johnson had returned to Tranmere as President and installed Rogers as chairman. In 2000, the team went on a high-profile cup run, beating several Premier League clubs as they reached their first major cup final - the League Cup final - where they met Leicester City F.C. and lost 2–1. However, they were relegated the following season.

Johnson had the club up for sale since 2002. In summer 2006, Tranmere revealed accounts which showed the club owed Johnson £6 million, and had plans to sell-off their second training ground at Ingleborough Road as a residential development. In August 2009 when it was revealed that Johnson's football club Tranmere Rovers had been put up for sale on eBay. Johnson had hired Dornoch Capital, a specialist in selling sports franchises, to sell his shareholding. The listing was removed immediately following a public outcry. A controlling interest in the club was sold to Mark Palios and his wife on 11 August 2014, who became the club's new owners.

== Death ==
On 10 January 2024, Johnson died peacefully after battling failing health surrounded by his family, at the age of 84.
