= Gavin Lynch =

English footballer

Personal information
- Date of birth: 7 September 1985 (age 41)
- Place of birth: Liverpool, England
- Position: Forward

Youth career
- Everton
- 2004: Chester City

Senior career*
Years	Team	Apps	(Gls)
2004–2005	Chester City	1	(0)
2005–2007	Marine		
2007–2008	Prescot Cables		
2008–2015	Warrington Town		
- * Club domestic league appearances and goals

Gavin Lynch (born 7 September 1985) is an English former footballer who played as a forward in The Football League for Chester City.

== Career ==
Lynch was an apprentice with Everton before being released in March 2004. He moved to Chester City, where he was awarded his first-team debut as a late substitute for Michael Branch against Halifax Town in the FA Cup second round on 4 December 2004. The following month saw Lynch's solitary Football League outing arrive when he replaced fellow youngster Michael Walsh in the closing stages of a 3–0 loss at Swansea City.

At the end of the season, Lynch was one of a high number of players released by Chester and he spent the next two years with Marine. In the summer of 2007, Lynch moved to Prescot Cables, marking his debut with a tremendous display against North Ferriby United. In February 2008 he moved to Warrington Town.
