= Cortez Belle =

English footballer

Personal information
- Full name: Cortez Marvin Belle
- Date of birth: 27 August 1983 (age 43)
- Place of birth: Coventry, England
- Height: 6 ft 4 in (1.93 m)
- Position: Defender

Youth career
- Coventry City FC

Senior career*
Years	Team	Apps	(Gls)
2003–2004	Merthyr Tydfil	34	(44)
2004–2005	Chester City	4	(1)
2005	→ Newport County	22	(6)
2005–2007	Llanelli	38	(15)
2007–2008	Halifax Town	16	(8)
2008	Northwich Victoria	16	(1)
2008–2009	Chippenham Town	0	(8)
2009–2011	Merthyr Tydfil		(21)
2011–2013	Port Talbot Town	42	(12)
2013–2015	Carmarthen Town	38	(24)
2015	→ Connah's Quay		
2015	Port Talbot Town		
2015–?	Merthyr Tydfil		
2016	Taff's Well		
2016–?	St Julians		
2017–?	Port Talbot Town		
2018	Taff's Well		
2018–?	Goytre United		

Managerial career
- 2018: Port Talbot Town (player-manager)
- * Club domestic league appearances and goals as of 19:16, 10 September 2011 (UTC)

Cortez Marvin Belle (born 27 August 1983) is an English former footballer who played as a defender and a striker. Belle played in the Football League for Chester City.

== Career ==
Belle played in the Football League for Chester City during the 2004–05 season, having signed in January 2004. He was red carded three times between September and January and only made one first-team appearance after this.

In January 2008, Belle signed for Northwich Victoria but left the club later that year to sign for Chippenham Town who made Belle their record signing. Belle only spent a short time at Chippenham though after his contract was terminated due to breach of conduct in December 2008. However the club still hold his registration meaning he cannot play for another English club without them compensating Chippenham.

In August 2011 he moved to Port Talbot Town. In June 2013 he moved to Carmarthen Town

In August 2016 he moved to St Julians, having signed for Taff's Well earlier than summer.

In July 2017 he returned to Port Talbot Town before again playing for Taff's Well in 2018. In October 2018 he moved on to Goytre United.

== Coaching career ==
In January 2018, Belle was appointed player-manager at Port Talbot Town.

== Personal life ==
In June 2017, Belle received a 12-month suspended prison sentence after stealing £15,000 from his employers Fitzalan High School where he was working as a staff absence and data manager. It was told in court that Belle stole the money to pay off his gambling debts.

On 4 January 2022, Belle was sentenced to eight weeks in prison for severe animal neglect. He was also banned from keeping animals for life.
