= Michael Brown (footballer, born 1985) =

English footballer

Personal information
- Date of birth: 27 February 1985 (age 41)
- Place of birth: Preston, England
- Position: Midfielder

Senior career*
Years	Team	Apps	(Gls)
2004–2005	Preston North End		
2004–2005	Chester City (loan)	18	(0)
2006–2007	Lancaster City		
2007–2008	Fleetwood Town	2	(0)
- * Club domestic league appearances and goals

Michael Brown (born 27 February 1985) is an English professional footballer who played for Preston North End and made 18 appearances in The Football League during a loan spell with Chester City. After suffering from illness for 18 months, Brown returned to football at Lancaster City before moving to Fleetwood Town. He is unattached.
