= Matt McKay (English footballer) =

English footballer

Personal information
- Full name: Matthew Paul McKay
- Date of birth: 21 January 1981 (age 45)
- Place of birth: Warrington, England
- Position: Midfielder

Senior career*
Years	Team	Apps	(Gls)
1997–1998	Chester City	5	(0)
1998–2002	Everton	0	(0)
Total		5	(0)
- * Club domestic league appearances and goals

Matt McKay (born 21 January 1981) is an English footballer who played as a midfielder in the Football League for Chester City.

McKay joined Everton from Chester on transfer deadline day on 26 March 1998. He did not make any appearances for the Everton first team and was forced to retire at the early age of 21 due to injury.
