= Graham Allen (footballer) =

English footballer (born 1977)

Personal information
- Full name: Graham Allen
- Date of birth: 8 April 1977 (age 49)
- Place of birth: Bolton, England
- Height: 6 ft 1 in (1.85 m)
- Position: Defender

Youth career
- ?–1994: Everton

Senior career*
Years	Team	Apps	(Gls)
1994–1998	Everton	6	(0)
1998–2004	Tranmere Rovers	200	(10)
2004–2006	Rushden & Diamonds	31	(2)
2006–2007	Chester City	3	(0)
2007	Bradford Park Avenue	?	(?)
Total		240	(12)
- * Club domestic league appearances and goals

Graham Allen (born 8 April 1977 in Bolton), is a former professional footballer who last played as a central defender for Bradford Park Avenue.

Graham started his career at Everton making his debut against Middlesbrough on 26 December 1996. He played 6 times for Everton before signing for Tranmere Rovers in 1998 after a successful loan spell.

He played 200 league games for Tranmere Rovers scoring 10 goals before signing for Rushden & Diamonds in 2004 playing 31 league games and scoring 2 goals before signing for Chester City in 2006. Injuries forced him to retire from professional football after only one year at the Deva Stadium, having made just three league appearances for the Blues.

After spending time on trial with Droylsden, Allen joined Bradford Park Avenue in August 2007, but was released in September 2007.
