= Michael Branch (footballer) =

English footballer

Personal information
- Full name: Paul Michael Branch
- Date of birth: 18 October 1978 (age 48)
- Place of birth: Liverpool, England
- Position: Striker

Youth career
- Everton

Senior career*
Years	Team	Apps	(Gls)
1995–2000	Everton	41	(3)
1998	→ Manchester City (loan)	4	(0)
1999	→ Birmingham City (loan)	0	(0)
1999–2000	→ Wolverhampton Wanderers (loan)	9	(4)
2000–2003	Wolverhampton Wanderers	62	(6)
2002	→ Reading (loan)	2	(0)
2002–2003	→ Hull City (loan)	7	(3)
2003–2004	Bradford City	33	(6)
2004–2006	Chester City	60	(16)
2007	Halifax Town	0	(0)
2010	Burscough		
Total		218	(38)

International career
	England U21	1	(0)
- * Club domestic league appearances and goals

Paul Michael Branch (born 18 October 1978) is an English former professional footballer who played as a striker from 1995 to 2010.

He played Premier League football for Everton after coming through the club's youth academy, also playing for the England U21 side where he earned one cap. He went on to play in the Football League with Manchester City, Birmingham City, Wolverhampton Wanderers, Reading, Hull City, Bradford City and Chester City before finishing his career in Non-league football with Halifax Town and Burscough.

On 9 November 2012, he was jailed for seven years for serious drug offences.

== Playing career ==
Born in Liverpool, Branch started his career with the Everton academy, before making his senior debut on 22 February 1996 as a substitute at Manchester United. He featured regularly in the first team during the 1996–97 season, scoring his only goals for the club.

He was unable to live up to early promise and was loaned to Manchester City, where he reunited with his former Everton manager Joe Royle. He made his Manchester City debut on 31 October 1998 in a 2–1 win against Colchester United. He started a further three games, but returned to Everton having failed to score a single goal.

After failing to break back into contention at Goodison Park, he was loaned to First Division Wolverhampton Wanderers in late 1999. He scored four times during his loan spell here, and the deal was made permanent for £500,000. He played regularly over the remainder of the 1999–2000 season and the following campaign, but added just six further goals. During the 1999/2000 season Branch scored a controversial goal during Wolves home fixture with Nottingham Forest, after he picked up what he thought was a loose ball played by the Forest keeper Dave Beasant who intended to put the ball out of play so Lee Naylor could receive treatment, in which he scored. But Beasant and other Forest players confronted him for what he had done and fellow players and officials had to split apart the two parties. He was then forced to be substituted shortly after for his own safety.

Following the arrival of Dave Jones as Wolves manager, Branch fell out of favour and had loan spells while transfer-listed with Reading and then Hull City over the next two years. He finally left Molineux to join Bradford City in July 2003 after not being offered a new contract.

His stay with Bradford City lasted just a solitary season before he joined newly promoted Chester City. He endured a turbulent spell with the League Two club, where he was taken off the transfer list in July 2006 after appearing to patch up his differences with manager Mark Wright. After failing to regain his place in the team, he left the club in October 2006.

In 2010, Branch was set to start playing for Burscough F.C. in the Northern Premier League

== Personal life ==
On 10 July 2012, Branch was arrested by officers of the Serious Organised Crime Agency. At a later trial at Chester Crown Court, Branch admitted charges of possession with intent to supply class A and class B drugs. One charge related to the handover of just under 3 kilograms (6.6 lb) of amphetamine to another man in a Liverpool car park in March 2012; a second charge related to the seizure of 1 kilogram (2.2 lb) of cocaine from his home address in Otterspool, Liverpool in July 2012. On 8 November 2012, Branch was jailed for seven years. His appeal against sentence was dismissed, on 14 February 2013, by three judges at the Court of Appeal. He was eventually released after three years, and in September 2016 was training to become an accountant.
