= 1991 Football League Third Division play-off final =

Association football match

- The match took place at Wembley Stadium.
Bolton Wanderers	Tranmere Rovers
0	1
- Date: 1 June 1991
- Venue: Wembley Stadium, London
- Referee: Keith Hackett (Sheffield)
- Attendance: 30,217
- Weather: Cool

The 1991 Football League Third Division play-off final was an association football match which was played on 1 June 1991 at Wembley Stadium, London, between Tranmere Rovers and Bolton Wanderers. It was to determine the fourth and final team to gain promotion from the Football League Third Division, the third tier of English football, to the Second Division. The top three teams of the 1990–91 Football League Third Division, Cambridge United, Southend United and Grimsby Town, gained automatic promotion, while the teams placed from fourth to seventh place took part in play-off semi-finals; the winners then competed for the final place in the Second Division for the 1991–92 season. Bolton and Tranmere beat Bury and Brentford, respectively, in the semi-finals.

The referee for the match, which was played in front of 30,217 spectators, was Keith Hackett. In the 14th minute, Tranmere's Scottish centre forward Jim Steel was injured and substituted for Chris Malkin. The first half ended scoreless despite several close chances for Tranmere, including a disallowed headed goal by Malkin. He hit the crossbar early in the second half but the match ended 0–0 and headed into extra time. Nine minutes into the first period of additional time, Ged Brannan's shot rebounded to Malkin, who scored to put Tranmere ahead. No further goals were scored and the match ended 1–0, with Tranmere being promoted to the Second Division for the first time in 52 years.

Tranmere's next season ended with them in fourteenth position in the Second Division. Bolton ended their following season in thirteenth position in the Third Division.

== Route to the final ==
Football League Third Division final table, leading positions
Pos	Team	Pld	W	D	L	GF	GA	GD	Pts
1	Cambridge United	46	25	11	10	75	45	+30	86
2	Southend United	46	26	7	13	67	51	+16	85
3	Grimsby Town	46	24	11	11	66	34	+32	83
4	Bolton Wanderers	46	24	11	11	64	50	+14	83
5	Tranmere Rovers	46	23	9	14	64	46	+18	78
6	Brentford	46	21	13	12	59	47	+12	76
7	Bury	46	20	13	13	57	56	+1	73

Bolton Wanderers finished the regular 1991–92 season in fourth position in the Football League Third Division, the third tier of the English football league system, one place and five points ahead of Tranmere Rovers. Both therefore missed out on the three automatic places for promotion to the Second Division and instead took part in the play-offs, along with Brentford and Bury, to determine the fourth promoted team. Bolton Wanderers finished level on points with Grimsby Town (who were promoted in third place with a superior goal difference), two points behind Southend United (who were promoted in second) and three behind league winners Cambridge United.

Bolton's opponents for their play-off semi-final were Bury and the first match of the two-legged tie took place at Gigg Lane in Bury on 19 May 1991. Shortly before half-time, Alan Stubbs fouled Bury's David Lee, conceding a penalty; taking it himself, Lee scored his 16th goal of the season. In the 60th minute, Mark Kearney brought down Bolton's Steve Thompson and Tony Philliskirk scored the subsequent penalty, equalising the score with his 27th goal of the season. The game ended 1–1; Derek Potter of The Guardian suggested that "there could hardly have been a more evenly balanced match". The second leg was played three days later at Burnden Park in Bolton. The match was even once again, but Bolton took the lead just before half-time: after Bury failed to clear a corner, Philliskirk struck the ball past Gary Kelly. Both Mark Seagraves and Stuart Storer made goal-line clearances to preserve Bolton's clean sheet and 1–0 win; they progressed to the final with a 2–1 aggregate victory.

Tranmere faced Brentford in their play-off semi-final, with the first leg being held at Griffin Park in Brentford on 19 May 1991. Terry Evans opened the scoring for the home side in the 13th minute before two goals from Steve Cooper gave Tranmere a 2–1 lead. Kevin Godfrey then equalised in the last minute of the game to ensure a 2–2 final result. The second leg took place three days later at Prenton Park in Tranmere. Ged Brannan scored the only goal of the game in the 34th minute, securing a 1–0 win in the match and a 3–2 aggregate victory.

== Match ==
=== Background ===
This was Bolton's third appearance in the play-offs: in 1987 they had been relegated to the Fourth Division when they lost to Aldershot in the semi-finals, and failed to progress to the 1990 final after being defeated by Notts County over two semi-final legs. Tranmere were participating in their second play-offs, having also lost to Notts County the previous year, 2–0 in the final. They had been promoted to the Third Division in the 1988–89 season and had not played in the second tier of English football since being relegated in the 1938–39 season. During the regular season, the sides played one another three times; the first match was in the Football League Trophy in November 1990, where Bolton won 1–0 at Burnden Park. In December the teams played their first league meeting of the season, with Bolton securing a 2–1 home victory, while the return match at Prenton Park the following March ended in a 1–1 draw. Tranmere had played at Wembley Stadium the previous week when they lost 3–2 to Birmingham City in the Associate Members' Cup Final.

The referee for the match was Keith Hackett from Sheffield. Bolton played in a 4–4–2 formation while Tranmere adopted a 5–3–2. The Tranmere players were incentivised by a £10,000 win bonus from their chairman Peter Johnson, who estimated that promotion to the Second Division would be worth £1 million to the club. Their team was at full strength with the exception of Steve Mungall and Ian Muir, who were long-term injured, and Neil McNab, who was receiving treatment for a damaged hamstring; Mark Hughes had sustained a groin injury in the build-up to the final but was selected to start.

=== Summary ===
The match kicked off around 3 p.m. on 1 June 1991 at Wembley Stadium in front of 30,217 spectators in cool conditions. In the 11th minute, Tranmere's goalkeeper Eric Nixon tipped a cross from Storer over the bar. Three minutes later, Tranmere's Scottish centre forward Jim Steel fell badly and was injured: he was taken off and substituted for Chris Malkin. Minutes later, Kenny Irons struck a shot over the Bolton crossbar. Just before half time, Malkin headed in a free kick from John Morrissey, but it was disallowed by Hackett, who adjudged that Tranmere had taken the set piece too quickly. Five minutes after half-time, another header from Malkin, this time from a Tony Thomas free kick, struck the Bolton crossbar. Nixon then saved a strike from Julian Darby. Paul Comstive also missed an opportunity to put Bolton ahead and the match ended 0–0, sending it into extra time.

Nine minutes into the first period of additional time, Dave Higgins took control of the ball and passed to Morrissey on the left wing. Morrissey cut inside, beating two Bolton players, and passed to Brannan, who struck the ball goalwards. It rebounded off the legs of Bolton's goalkeeper David Felgate and fell to Malkin, who scored to put Tranmere ahead. Brian Glanville, writing in The Sunday Times declared that "there could scarcely have been a more appropriate scorer". A late shot from Phil Brown was saved by Nixon in the Tranmere goal. No further goals were scored and the match ended 1–0, with Tranmere being promoted to the Second Division for the first time in 52 years.

=== Details ===
1 June 1991	Bolton Wanderers	0–1 (a.e.t.)	Tranmere Rovers	Wembley Stadium, London
			Malkin 99'	Attendance: 30,217; Referee: Keith Hackett (Sheffield)

1	David Felgate
2	Phil Brown
3	Barry Cowdrill
4	Paul Comstive
5	Mark Seagraves
6	Alan Stubbs
7	Stuart Storer (substituted off) 100'
8	Steve Thompson
9	Tony Cunningham (substituted off) 68'
10	Tony Philliskirk
11	Julian Darby
Substitutes:
12	Scott Green (substituted in) 100'
13	Dave Reeves (substituted in) 68'
Manager:
Phil Neal

1	Eric Nixon
2	Dave Higgins
3	Ged Brannan
4	Kenny Irons
5	Mark Hughes
6	Shaun Garnett
7	John Morrissey
8	Dave Martindale (substituted off) 74'
9	Jim Steel (substituted off) 14'
10	Steve Cooper
11	Tony Thomas
Substitutes:
12	Jim Harvey (substituted in) 74'
13	Chris Malkin (substituted in) 14'
Manager:
Johnny King

== Post-match ==
After the match, Tranmere's manager John King spoke about plans for the next season: "We have taken giant strides in recent years. We have a wonderful stadium, wonderful fans. Now we must push for the first division ... I have never been so proud of my team." David Prentice, writing in the Liverpool Echo, remarked that "Rovers ran Bolton ragged".

Tranmere's next season ended with them in fourteenth position in the Second Division. Bolton ended their following season in thirteenth position in the Third Division.
