= 1992–93 Tranmere Rovers F.C. season =

Tranmere Rovers
1992–93 season
- Chairman: Peter Johnson
- Manager: John King
- Stadium: Prenton Park
- First Division: 4th
- FA Cup: Fourth round
- League Cup: First round
- Average home league attendance: 8,071
Home colours

During the 1992–93 English football season, Tranmere Rovers F.C. competed in the Football League First Division.

== Season summary ==
In the 1992–93 season, Tranmere finished 4th and as a result, this qualified them for the play-offs, however they were beaten 5–4 on aggregate by Swindon Town at the semi-final stage.

== Final league table ==
Pos	Team	Pld	W	D	L	GF	GA	GD	Pts	Qualification or relegation
2	West Ham United (P)	46	26	10	10	81	41	+40	88	Promotion to the Premier League
3	Portsmouth	46	26	10	10	80	46	+34	88	Qualification for the First Division play-offs
4	Tranmere Rovers	46	23	10	13	72	56	+16	79	Qualification for the First Division play-offs
5	Swindon Town (O, P)	46	21	13	12	74	59	+15	76	Qualification for the First Division play-offs
6	Leicester City	46	22	10	14	71	64	+7	76	Qualification for the First Division play-offs

Source: rsssf.com
Rules for classification: 1) Points; 2) Goals scored; 3) Goal difference
(O) Play-off winners; (P) Promoted

== Results ==
Tranmere Rovers' score comes first

=== Legend ===
Win	Draw	Loss

=== Football League First Division ===
Date	Opponent	Venue	Result	Attendance	Scorers
15 August 1992	Cambridge United	H	2–0	5,248	Aldridge, Malkin
22 August 1992	Sunderland	A	0–1	16,667	
28 August 1992	Bristol Rovers	H	2–1	5,458	Garnett, Muir
5 September 1992	Luton Town	A	3–3	6,801	Aldridge, Muir, Nevin
12 September 1992	Grimsby Town	H	1–1	5,330	Nevin
18 September 1992	Charlton Athletic	H	0–0	6,055	
26 September 1992	Oxford United	A	2–1	4,683	Morrissey, Nevin
29 September 1992	Notts County	H	3–1	5,410	Aldridge, Brennan, Mungall
3 October 1992	Bristol City	H	3–0	5,975	Aldridge (2), Nevin
10 October 1992	Newcastle United	A	0–1	30,137	
17 October 1992	Birmingham City	H	4–0	7,901	Aldridge (2, 1 pen), Mungall, Irons
24 October 1992	Watford	A	2–3	6,937	Morrissey, (own goal)
30 October 1992	Peterborough United	H	1–1	8,068	Malkin
3 November 1992	Southend United	H	3–0	5,870	Morrissey, McNab, Aldridge
7 November 1992	Leicester City	A	1–0	13,538	Nevin
14 November 1992	Brentford	H	3–2	7,852	Nevin (2), Irons
21 November 1992	Portsmouth	A	0–4	9,982	
28 November 1992	Derby County	A	2–1	15,665	Aldridge (2)
4 December 1992	West Ham United	H	5–2	11,782	Aldridge (3), Irons, Malkin
19 December 1992	Wolverhampton Wanderers	H	3–0	9,758	Aldridge (3)
26 December 1992	Millwall	H	1–1	13,118	Morrissey
28 December 1992	Barnsley	A	1–3	8,204	Mungall
9 January 1993	Charlton Athletic	A	2–2	8,337	Aldridge, Nevin
15 January 1993	Oxford United	H	4–0	8,317	Higgins, Aldridge (2, 1 pen), (own goal)
26 January 1993	Notts County	A	1–5	5,642	Higgins
6 February 1993	Cambridge United	A	1–0	4,802	McNab
13 February 1993	Luton Town	H	0–2	8,723	
20 February 1993	Bristol Rovers	A	0–1	5,135	
23 February 1993	Swindon Town	A	0–2	10,059	
28 February 1993	Newcastle United	H	0–3	13,082	
6 March 1993	Bristol City	A	3–1	8,810	Malkin (2), Nevin
9 March 1993	Brentford	A	1–0	7,993	Nevin
13 March 1993	Leicester City	H	2–3	9,680	Morrissey, Malkin
16 March 1993	Grimsby Town	A	0–0	5,686	
20 March 1993	West Ham United	A	0–2	16,369	
23 March 1993	Portsmouth	H	0–2	7,472	
26 March 1993	Southend United	A	2–1	4,147	Martindale, Coyne
2 April 1993	Derby County	H	2–1	7,774	Nevin (2)
6 April 1993	Swindon Town	H	3–1	8,335	Irons (3)
10 April 1993	Millwall	A	0–0	9,392	
12 April 1993	Barnsley	H	2–1	6,436	Irons, Higgins
17 April 1993	Wolverhampton Wanderers	A	2–0	13,060	Higgins, Proctor
24 April 1993	Birmingham City	A	0–0	14,600	
1 May 1993	Watford	H	2–1	8,315	Aldridge (2)
4 May 1993	Sunderland	H	2–1	9,683	Martindale, Nevin
8 May 1993	Peterborough United	A	1–1	8,189	Malkin

=== First Division play-offs ===
Round	Date	Opponent	Venue	Result	Attendance	Scorers
SF 1st Leg	16 May 1993	Swindon Town	A	1–3	14,230	Morrissey
SF 2nd Leg	19 May 1993	Swindon Town	H	3–2 (lost 4–5 on agg)	16,083	Proctor, Nevin, Irons (pen)

=== FA Cup ===
Round	Date	Opponent	Venue	Result	Attendance	Goalscorers
R3	2 January 1993	Oldham Athletic	A	2–2	13,389	Nevin, Aldridge (pen)
R3R	13 January 1993	Oldham Athletic	H	3–0	?	Vickers, Morrissey (2)
R4	23 January 1993	Ipswich Town	H	1–2	13,683	Nevin

=== League Cup ===
Round	Date	Opponent	Venue	Result	Attendance	Goalscorers
R1 First Leg	19 August 1992	Blackpool	H	3–0	3,719	Aldridge (2), Garnett
R1 Second Leg	25 August 1992	Blackpool	A	0–4 (lost 3–4 on agg)	2,734	

=== Anglo-Italian Cup ===
Round	Date	Opponent	Venue	Result	Attendance	Goalscorers
PR Group 4	1 September 1992	Peterborough United	A	0–0	1,954	
PR Group 4	15 September 1992	Wolverhampton Wanderers	H	2–1	3,361	Aldridge (2, 1 pen)
Group B	11 November 1992	A.C. Reggiana	A	0–0	2,251	
Group B	24 November 1992	U.S. Cremonese	H	1–2	5,727	Malkin
Group B	8 December 1992	Pisa S.C.	A	1–0	750	Irons
Group B	16 December 1992	Cosenza 1914	H	2–1	3,659	Irons, Morrissey

== Squad ==
Note: Flags indicate national team as defined under FIFA eligibility rules; some limited exceptions apply. Players may hold more than one non-FIFA nationality.

Pos.	Nation	Player
GK	ENG	Eric Nixon
DF	ENG	Dave Higgins
DF	SCO	Steve Mungall
DF	ENG	Tony Thomas
DF	ENG	John McGreal
DF	NIR	Ian Nolan
MF	ENG	John Morrissey
MF	ENG	Kenny Irons
MF	SCO	Pat Nevin
MF	ENG	Dave Martindale
FW	IRL	John Aldridge
FW	ENG	Chris Malkin

Pos.	Nation	Player
FW	ENG	Ian Muir
DF	ENG	Steve Vickers
DF	ENG	Ged Brannan
DF	ENG	Shaun Garnett
GK	WAL	Danny Coyne
DF	WAL	Mark Hughes
MF	ENG	Graham Branch
MF	SCO	Neil McNab
FW	ENG	Steve Cooper
MF	ENG	Mark Proctor
FW	IRL	Tommy Coyne
MF	WAL	Alan Morgan
