= 1994–95 Tranmere Rovers F.C. season =

Tranmere Rovers
1994–95 season
- Chairman: Frank Corfe
- Manager: John King
- Stadium: Prenton Park
- First Division: 5th
- FA Cup: Fourth round
- League Cup: Third round
- Anglo-Italian Cup: Group stage
- Average home league attendance: 8,906

During the 1994–95 English football season, Tranmere Rovers F.C. competed in the Football League First Division.

A reconstructed Prenton Park was opened in March 1995, with the all seater stadium now holding just under 17,000 supporters.

== Season summary ==
In the 1994–95 campaign, Tranmere missed out on promotion via the play-offs for a third consecutive season after losing to Reading in the semi-finals. A reconstructed Prenton Park was opened in March 1995, with the all seater stadium now holding just under 17,000 supporters.

== Final league table ==
Pos	Team	Pld	W	D	L	GF	GA	GD	Pts	Qualification or relegation
3	Bolton Wanderers (O, P)	46	21	14	11	67	45	+22	77	Qualification for the First Division play-offs
4	Wolverhampton Wanderers	46	21	13	12	77	61	+16	76	Qualification for the First Division play-offs
5	Tranmere Rovers	46	22	10	14	67	58	+9	76	Qualification for the First Division play-offs
6	Barnsley	46	20	12	14	63	52	+11	72	
7	Watford	46	19	13	14	52	46	+6	70	

Rules for classification: 1) Points; 2) Goals scored; 3) Goal difference
(O) Play-off winners; (P) Promoted

== Results ==
Tranmere Rovers' score comes first

=== Legend ===
Win	Draw	Loss

=== Football League First Division ===
Date	Opponent	Venue	Result	Attendance	Scorers
13 August 1994	Stoke City	A	0–1	15,915	
20 August 1994	Swindon Town	H	3–2	8,482	Aldridge (2), Nevin
27 August 1994	Grimsby Town	A	1–3	4,087	Aldridge (pen)
30 August 1994	Luton Town	H	4–2	5,480	Aldridge (3), Malkin
3 September 1994	Sheffield United	H	2–1	7,253	Malkin, Aldridge
10 September 1994	Wolverhampton Wanderers	A	0–2	27,030	
14 September 1994	Portsmouth	A	1–1	6,383	O'Brien
17 September 1994	Millwall	H	3–1	6,243	Malkin (2), Aldridge
24 September 1994	Sunderland	H	1–0	7,500	Malkin
1 October 1994	Burnley	A	1–1	12,427	Aldridge
8 October 1994	Middlesbrough	A	1–0	18,497	Aldridge
15 October 1994	West Bromwich Albion	H	3–1	7,391	Aldridge (3)
22 October 1994	Watford	A	0–2	6,987	
29 October 1994	Port Vale	H	1–1	6,972	Morrissey
1 November 1994	Barnsley	H	6–1	5,592	Aldridge (4), Malkin (2)
6 November 1994	Oldham Athletic	A	0–0	6,475	
19 November 1994	Charlton Athletic	H	1–1	7,567	Malkin
26 November 1994	Reading	A	3–1	7,887	Brannan, Muir (2)
3 December 1994	Watford	H	2–1	7,301	Malkin, Irons
6 December 1994	Notts County	A	0–1	4,703	
10 December 1994	Swindon Town	A	2–2	8,608	Stevens, Mungall
17 December 1994	Stoke City	H	0–1	7,601	
26 December 1994	Derby County	H	3–1	11,581	Malkin (2), Jones
27 December 1994	Bolton Wanderers	A	0–1	16,782	
31 December 1994	Bristol City	H	2–0	7,439	Jones, Irons
2 January 1995	Southend United	A	0–0	5,195	
15 January 1995	Port Vale	A	0–2	7,944	
22 January 1995	Oldham Athletic	H	3–1	5,581	Malkin, Muir, Brannan
4 February 1995	Notts County	H	3–2	6,105	Malkin (2), Morrissey
11 February 1995	Barnsley	A	2–2	5,506	Muir, Jones
18 February 1995	Reading	H	1–0	8,750	Muir
21 February 1995	Charlton Athletic	A	1–0	11,860	Nevin
25 February 1995	Burnley	H	4–1	9,909	Muir (2), Nevin, Alridge
5 March 1995	Sunderland	A	1–0	12,043	Garnett
7 March 1995	Sheffield United	A	0–2	14,127	
11 March 1995	Grimsby Town	H	2–0	15,810	Morrissey, Aldridge (pen)
18 March 1995	Luton Town	A	0–2	6,660	
25 March 1995	Millwall	A	1–2	7,470	Malkin
1 April 1995	Portsmouth	H	4–2	8,722	Aldridge (2), Malkin, Irons
8 April 1995	Bristol City	A	1–0	6,723	Aldridge (pen)
14 April 1995	Bolton Wanderers	H	1–0	14,959	Nevin
17 April 1995	Derby County	A	0–5	13,957	
21 April 1995	Southend United	H	0–2	9,971	
30 April 1995	West Bromwich Albion	A	1–5	17,846	Aldridge
3 May 1995	Wolverhampton Wanderers	H	1–1	12,306	Aldridge
7 May 1995	Middlesbrough	H	1–1	16,337	Irons

=== First Division play-offs ===
Round	Date	Opponent	Venue	Result	Attendance	Goalscorers
SF 1st leg	14 May 1995	Reading	H	1–3	12,207	Malkin
SF 2nd leg	17 May 1995	Reading	A	0–0 (lost 1–3 on agg)	13,245	

=== FA Cup ===
Round	Date	Opponent	Venue	Result	Attendance	Goalscorers
R3	7 January 1995	Bury	A	2–2	5,755	Muir (2)
R3R	18 January 1995	Bury	H	3–0	7,921	O'Brien, Muir, Malkin
R4	29 January 1995	Wimbledon	H	0–2	11,637	

=== League Cup ===
Round	Date	Opponent	Venue	Result	Attendance	Goalscorers
R2 First Leg	21 September 1994	Brentford	H	1–0	3,754	Brennan
R2 Second Leg	27 September 1994	Brentford	A	0–0 (won 1–0 on agg)	4,076	
R3	26 October 1994	Norwich City	H	1–1	10,232	Aldridge
R3R	9 November 1994	Norwich City	A	2–4	13,331	Nevin, Irons

=== Anglo-Italian Cup ===
Round	Date	Opponent	Venue	Result	Attendance	Goalscorers
Group A	24 August 1994	Venezia	H	2–2	3,012	
Group A	6 September 1994	Atalanta	A	0–2	4,000	
Group A	4 October 1994	Ascoli	H	0–1	4,546	
Group A	15 November 1994	U.S. Lecce	A	0–0	286	

== Squad ==
Note: Flags indicate national team as defined under FIFA eligibility rules; some limited exceptions apply. Players may hold more than one non-FIFA nationality.

No.	Pos.	Nation	Player
—	GK	(England) ENG	Eric Nixon
—	GK	(Wales) WAL	Danny Coyne
—	DF	(England) ENG	Dave Higgins
—	DF	(England) ENG	Gary Stevens
—	DF	(England) ENG	Tony Thomas
—	DF	(England) ENG	Steve Mungall
—	DF	(England) ENG	Shaun Garnett
—	DF	(England) ENG	Dave Challinor
—	DF	(England) ENG	John McGreal
—	DF	(England) ENG	Dave Rogers
—	MF	(England) ENG	John Morrissey
—	MF	(Scotland) SCO	Pat Nevin
—	MF	(England) ENG	Ged Brannan

No.	Pos.	Nation	Player
—	MF	(Republic of Ireland) IRL	Liam O'Brien
—	MF	(England) ENG	Kenny Irons
—	MF	(England) ENG	Graham Branch
—	MF	(Wales) WAL	Alan Morgan
—	MF	(Republic of Ireland) IRL	Alan Mahon
—	MF	(Wales) WAL	Jon Kenworthy
—	MF	(England) ENG	Mike Edwards
—	FW	(Republic of Ireland) IRL	John Aldridge
—	FW	(England) ENG	Ian Muir
—	FW	(England) ENG	Chris Malkin
—	FW	(England) ENG	Gary Jones
—	FW	(England) ENG	Ian Thomas-Moore
—	FW	(England) ENG	Gregg Blundell
