= 1995–96 Tranmere Rovers F.C. season =

Tranmere Rovers
1995–96 season
- Chairman: Frank Corfe
- Manager: John King (until 12 April); John Aldridge (player-manager from 12 April)
- Stadium: Prenton Park
- First Division: 13th
- FA Cup: Third round
- League Cup: Third round
- Top goalscorer: League: John Aldridge (27); All: John Aldridge (29)
- Average home league attendance: 7,862

During the 1995–96 English football season, Tranmere Rovers F.C. competed in the Football League First Division.

== Season summary ==
In the 1995–96 season, Tranmere made a great start, winning eight of their first 16 league games and by 22 November sat in 3rd place and four points of the top and automatic promotion seemed to be on course but afterwards Tranmere went on a horrendous run of form and on 12 April 1996 which saw Tranmere near the relegation zone after only four wins from 24 league games since 22 November, chairman Frank Corfe appointed John Aldridge as player-manager, and King was "moved upstairs" to become Director of football. They finished a disappointing campaign in 13th place.

== Final league table ==
Pos	Team	Pld	W	D	L	GF	GA	GD	Pts
11	West Bromwich Albion	46	16	12	18	60	68	−8	60
12	Port Vale	46	15	15	16	59	66	−7	60
13	Tranmere Rovers	46	14	17	15	64	60	+4	59
14	Southend United	46	15	14	17	52	61	−9	59
15	Birmingham City	46	15	13	18	61	64	−3	58

Rules for classification: 1) Points; 2) Goals scored; 3) Goal difference

== Results ==
Tranmere Rovers' score comes first

=== Legend ===
Win	Draw	Loss

=== Football League First Division ===
Date	Opponent	Venue	Result	Attendance	Scorers
12 August 1995	Wolverhampton Wanderers	H	2–2	11,880	O'Brien, Aldridge
19 August 1995	Sheffield United	A	2–0	11,247	Aldridge (2)
26 August 1995	Huddersfield Town	H	3–1	9,072	O'Brien, Aldridge, Thomas-Moore
29 August 1995	Barnsley	A	1–2	9,710	Aldridge
9 September 1995	Charlton Athletic	H	0–0	7,402	
12 September 1995	West Bromwich Albion	H	2–2	7,196	Bennett, Aldridge
16 September 1995	Stoke City	A	0–0	8,609	
23 September 1995	Portsmouth	A	2–0	11,127	Nevin, Bennett
30 September 1995	Watford	H	2–3	7,041	Aldridge, Bennett
7 October 1995	Luton Town	H	1–0	6,680	Aldridge
14 October 1995	Millwall	A	2–2	9,293	Bennett, Thomas-Moore
21 October 1995	Southend United	H	3–0	6,584	Thomas-Moore (2), Bennett
29 October 1995	Norwich City	A	1–1	15,513	Thomas-Moore
4 November 1995	Derby County	H	5–1	8,565	Thomas-Moore, Nevin, Aldridge (2), Bennett
19 November 1995	Leicester City	A	1–0	13,125	Thomas-Moore
22 November 1995	Port Vale	H	2–1	6,681	Aldridge (2)
25 November 1995	Grimsby Town	H	0–1	7,500	
2 December 1995	Luton Town	A	2–3	6,025	G Jones, Bennett
9 December 1995	Portsmouth	H	1–2	6,678	Thomas-Moore
16 December 1995	Watford	A	0–3	7,257	
23 December 1995	Birmingham City	A	0–1	18,439	
26 December 1995	Oldham Athletic	H	2–0	9,783	Aldridge (2)
1 January 1996	Reading	A	0–1	8,421	
13 January 1996	Sheffield United	H	1–1	7,321	Thomas-Moore
20 January 1996	Wolverhampton Wanderers	A	1–2	24,173	Aldridge
30 January 1996	Sunderland	A	0–0	17,376	
3 February 1996	Huddersfield Town	A	0–1	12,041	
10 February 1996	Barnsley	H	1–3	6,376	Aldridge
17 February 1996	West Bromwich Albion	A	1–1	15,014	Branch
20 February 1996	Crystal Palace	H	2–3	5,253	Aldridge, Bennett
24 February 1996	Stoke City	H	0–0	8,312	
3 March 1996	Oldham Athletic	A	2–1	4,225	Nevin, Aldridge
9 March 1996	Birmingham City	H	2–2	8,696	Aldridge, Rogers
12 March 1996	Crystal Palace	A	1–2	13,183	Branch
16 March 1996	Ipswich Town	A	2–1	11,759	Aldridge, Bennett
23 March 1996	Reading	H	2–1	6,249	Aldridge, Hopkins (own goal)
30 March 1996	Southend United	A	0–2	4,741	
2 April 1996	Millwall	H	2–2	5,850	Rogers, Aldridge (pen)
6 April 1996	Norwich City	H	1–1	6,618	Aldridge
8 April 1996	Derby County	A	2–6	16,723	Aldridge (pen), Cook
13 April 1996	Leicester City	H	1–1	8,882	Lennon (own goal)
17 April 1996	Ipswich Town	H	5–2	6,008	Irons (2), O'Brien, Aldridge, Morgan
20 April 1996	Port Vale	A	1–1	7,419	O'Brien
27 April 1996	Grimsby Town	A	1–1	5,408	Aldridge
30 April 1996	Charlton Athletic	A	0–0	11,053	
5 May 1996	Sunderland	H	2–0	16,188	Irons, Aldridge (pen)

=== FA Cup ===
Round	Date	Opponent	Venue	Result	Attendance	Goalscorers
R3	6 January 1996	Queens Park Rangers	H	0–2	10,230	

=== League Cup ===
Round	Date	Opponent	Venue	Result	Attendance	Goalscorers
R2 1st Leg	19 September 1995	Oldham Athletic	H	1–0	8,264	Aldridge
R2 2nd Leg	4 October 1995	Oldham Athletic	A	3–1 (won 4–1 on agg)	5,335	G Jones (2), Brannan
R3	24 October 1995	Birmingham City	A	1–1	13,752	Thomas-Moore
R3R	8 November 1995	Birmingham City	H	1–3 (a.e.t.)	9,151	Aldridge

== Squad ==
Note: Flags indicate national team as defined under FIFA eligibility rules; some limited exceptions apply. Players may hold more than one non-FIFA nationality.

No.	Pos.	Nation	Player
—	GK	(Wales) WAL	Danny Coyne
—	GK	(England) ENG	Eric Nixon
—	DF	(England) ENG	Graham Branch
—	DF	(England) ENG	Ged Brannan
—	DF	(England) ENG	Dave Challinor
—	DF	(England) ENG	Shaun Garnett
—	DF	(England) ENG	Dave Higgins
—	DF	(England) ENG	Paul Jones
—	DF	(England) ENG	John McGreal
—	DF	(Scotland) SCO	Steve Mungall
—	DF	(England) ENG	Alan Rogers
—	DF	(England) ENG	Gary Scott
—	DF	(England) ENG	Gary Stevens
—	DF	(England) ENG	Shaun Teale
—	DF	(England) ENG	Tony Thomas

No.	Pos.	Nation	Player
—	MF	(England) ENG	Paul Cook
—	MF	(England) ENG	Kenny Irons
—	MF	(Wales) WAL	Jon Kenworthy
—	MF	(Republic of Ireland) IRL	Alan Mahon
—	MF	(Wales) WAL	Alan Morgan
—	MF	(England) ENG	John Morrissey
—	MF	(Scotland) SCO	Pat Nevin
—	MF	(Republic of Ireland) IRL	Liam O'Brien
—	FW	(Republic of Ireland) IRL	John Aldridge (player-manager from 12 April)
—	FW	(England) ENG	Gary Bennett
—	FW	(England) ENG	Gregg Blundell
—	FW	(England) ENG	Jamie Hughes
—	FW	(England) ENG	Gary Jones
—	FW	(England) ENG	Ian Thomas-Moore
