= 1991 Associate Members' Cup final =

1991 Associate Members' Cup Final
- Event: 1990–91 Associate Members' Cup
Birmingham City	Tranmere Rovers
3	2
- Date: 26 May 1991
- Venue: Wembley Stadium, London
- Attendance: 58,756

The 1991 Associate Members' Cup Final, known as the Leyland DAF Cup for sponsorship reasons, was the 8th final of the domestic football cup competition for teams from the Third Division and Fourth Division. The final was played at Wembley Stadium, London on 26 May 1991, and was contested by Birmingham City and Tranmere Rovers. Birmingham won the match 3–2, with Simon Sturridge and John Gayle scoring the goals for the winning team.

== Match details ==
26 May 1991
15:00 BST

Birmingham City	3–2	Tranmere Rovers
Sturridge 20'; Gayle 40', 84'	Report	Cooper 60'; Steel 68'

Wembley Stadium, London
Attendance: 58,756
Referee: J.Martin (Alton)

Birmingham City	Tranmere Rovers

GK	1	Martin Thomas
DF	2	Ian Clarkson
DF	5	Vince Overson (c)
DF	6	Trevor Matthewson
DF	3	John Frain
MF	4	Mark Yates
MF	7	Dean Peer
MF	9	Phil Robinson
MF	10	Nigel Gleghorn
FW	8	John Gayle
FW	11	Simon Sturridge	(substituted off) 64'
Substitutes:
MF	12	Robert Hopkins
FW	14	Dennis Bailey	(substituted on) 64'
Manager:
Lou Macari

GK	1	Eric Nixon
DF	2	Dave Higgins
MF	3	Ged Brannan
MF	4	Neil McNab	(substituted off) 60'
DF	5	Mark Hughes
DF	6	Steve Vickers	(substituted off) 60'
MF	7	John Morrissey
MF	8	Kenny Irons
FW	9	Jim Steel
FW	10	Steve Cooper
DF	11	Tony Thomas
Substitutes:
FW	12	Chris Malkin	(substituted on) 60'
MF	14	Dave Martindale	(substituted on) 60'
Manager:
John King
