= 1990 Football League Third Division play-off final =

Association football match

- The match took place at Wembley Stadium.
| Notts County | Tranmere Rovers |
| 2 | 0 |
- Date: 27 May 1990
- Venue: Wembley Stadium, London
- Referee: Roger Milford
- Attendance: 29,252

The 1990 Football League Third Division play-off final was an association football match which was played on 27 May 1990 at Wembley Stadium, London, between Notts County and Tranmere Rovers. The match was to determine the third and final team to gain promotion from the Football League Third Division, the third tier of English football, to the Second Division. The top two teams of the 1989–90 Football League Third Division season gained automatic promotion to the Second Division, while the clubs placed from third to sixth place in the table took part in play-offs. The winners of the play-off semi-finals competed for the final place for the 1990–91 season in the Second Division. Bury and Bolton Wanderers were the losing semi-finalists, having been defeated by Tranmere and Notts County respectively. This was the first season that the play-off final was determined over a single match and the first to be held at Wembley.

The match was refereed by Roger Milford. Notts County dominated the early stages of the match with Bartlett having two shots saved within the first 15 minutes and took the lead in the 31st minute through cross from Kevin Bartlett found Tommy Johnson whose low strike beat Eric Nixon in the Tranmere goal. In the 63rd minute, a free kick played in by Phil Robinson reached Craig Short at the far post who headed it in to make the score 2–0. The final whistle brought the game to a close with Notts County 2–0 winners and gaining promotion to the Second Division.

Notts County's next season saw them finish in fourth position in the Second Division and qualify for the play-offs. After beating Middlesbrough in the semi-final 2–1 on aggregate, they defeated Brighton & Hove Albion 3–1 in the final to gain back-to-back promotions. Tranmere Rovers ended their following season in fifth place in the Third Division to qualify for the play-offs, where they defeated Brentford 3–2 on aggregate in the semi-final and Bolton 1–0 in the final to secure promotion to the Second Division.

== Route to the final ==
Football League Third Division final table, leading positions
| Pos | Team | Pld | W | D | L | GF | GA | GD | Pts |
|---|---|---|---|---|---|---|---|---|---|
| 1 | Bristol Rovers | 46 | 26 | 15 | 5 | 71 | 35 | +36 | 93 |
| 2 | Bristol City | 46 | 27 | 10 | 9 | 76 | 40 | +36 | 91 |
| 3 | Notts County | 46 | 25 | 12 | 9 | 73 | 53 | +20 | 87 |
| 4 | Tranmere Rovers | 46 | 23 | 11 | 12 | 86 | 49 | +37 | 80 |
| 5 | Bury | 46 | 21 | 11 | 14 | 70 | 49 | +21 | 74 |
| 6 | Bolton Wanderers | 46 | 18 | 15 | 13 | 59 | 48 | +11 | 69 |

Notts County finished the regular 1989–90 season in third position in the Football League Third Division, the third tier of the English football league system, one place and seven points ahead of Tranmere Rovers. Both therefore missed out on the two automatic places for promotion to the Second Division and instead took part in the play-offs to determine the third promoted team. Notts County finished four points behind Bristol City (who were promoted in second place), and six behind league winners Bristol Rovers.

Tranmere's opposition for their play-off semi-final were Bury with the first match of the two-legged tie taking place at Gigg Lane in Bury on 13 May 1990. The visitors dominated the game which Ian Ross of The Times described as "a strangely passionless affair, bearing in mind the significance of the game, and played almost exclusively in midfield". Both Neil McNab and Chris Malkin went close to scoring for Tranmere early in the second half before Eric Nixon made an oustretched save to deny a diving header from Tony Cunningham in the 62nd minute, and the match ended goalless. The second leg was held at Prenton Park in Tranmere three days later. Malkin gave the home side the lead four minutes before half-time before Ian Muir made it 2–0 from the penalty spot, giving Tranmere a 2–0 aggregate victory.

Notts County faced Bolton Wanderers in their semi-final and the first leg was played at Burnden Park in Bolton on 13 May 1990. The home side took the lead in the fourteenth minute from the penalty spot: Nick Platnauer fouled Stuart Storer and Tony Philliskirk scored the spot kick. With two minutes of the first half remaining, Gary Lund scored with a header from a Dean Thomas corner to level the score. After a goalless second half, the match ended 1–1. The second leg took place at Meadow Lane in Nottingham three days later. In the 82nd second of the match, Bolton took the lead: a corner from Thomas found Lund at the far post who passed to Tommy Johnson who scored his 19th goal of the season. Notts County had several other opportunities to score but as Bolton began to increase the pressure, Kevin Bartlett was sent clear with a pass from Thomas and made it 2–0. Notts County won the tie 3–1 on aggregate and progressed to the final.

== Match ==
=== Background ===
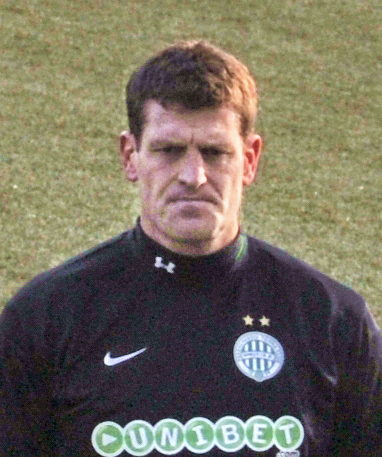
Craig Short (pictured in 2010) scored Notts County's second goal.

This was Notts County's second appearance in the play-offs having been defeated 4–2 on aggregate by Walsall in the 1988 play-offs. They had played in the third tier of English football since being relegated from the Second Division in the 1984–85 season. Tranmere Rovers were participating in their first play-off and having been promoted to the Third Division the previous season as runners-up in the Fourth Division, they were aiming for back-to-back promotions. They had last appeared in the second tier of English football in the 1938–39 season. Tranmere had played at Wembley Stadium the weekend before the play-off final in the Associate Members' Cup Final where they beat Bristol Rovers 2–1. Notts County were making their first appearance at the national stadium.

In the matches between play-off finalists during the regular season, both sides won their home games with Notts County winning 1–0 at Meadow Lane in October 1989 and Tranmere securing a 2–0 victory at Prenton Park the following March. The final was refereed by Roger Milford.

=== Summary ===
The match kicked off around 3 p.m. at Wembley Stadium on 27 May 1990 in front of 29,252 spectators. Notts County dominated the early stages of the match with Bartlett having two shots saved within the first 15 minutes. They took the lead in the 31st minute: a cross from Bartlett found Johnson whose low strike beat Nixon in the Tranmere goal. No changes were made by either side to their personnel at half-time. Bartlett then beat Nixon to the ball and attempted to lob it into the net but Steve Vickers cleared it. Steve Cherry, the Notts County goalkeeper, was forced to tip Jim Steel's header over the bar. In the 63rd minute, a free kick played in by Phil Robinson reached Craig Short at the far post who headed it in to make the score 2–0. With 13 minutes of the game remaining, Johnson ran through the Tranmere defence and was fouled by Steve Mungall and a free kick was awarded. Vickers was shown a yellow card for dissent, claiming it should have been a penalty. Johnson's set piece beat the wall but Nixon pushed the ball onto the goalpost. David Fairclough was then brought on to replace Mungall and his first significant contribution was to head the ball wide of the goal from 8 yards (7.3 m) following a McNab cross. Late in the match, Shaun Garnett was booked for a foul on Lund before the final whistle brought the game to a close with Notts County 2–0 winners and gaining promotion to the Second Division.

=== Details ===
| 27 May 1990 | Notts County | 2–0 | Tranmere Rovers | Wembley Stadium, London |
| | Johnson 31'; Short 62' | | | Attendance: 29,252 |

| 1 | Steve Cherry |
| 2 | Charlie Palmer |
| 3 | Nick Platnauer |
| 4 | Craig Short |
| 5 | Dean Yates |
| 6 | Phil Robinson |
| 7 | Dean Thomas |
| 8 | Phil Turner |
| 9 | Kevin Bartlett |
| 10 | Gary Lund |
| 11 | Tommy Johnson |
Manager:
Neil Warnock

| 1 | Eric Nixon |
| 2 | Steve Mungall (substituted off) 77' |
| 3 | Shaun Garnett (yellow card) |
| 4 | Neil McNab |
| 5 | Mark Hughes |
| 6 | Steve Vickers (yellow card) 77' |
| 7 | Chris Malkin |
| 8 | Jim Harvey (substituted off) 68' |
| 9 | Jim Steel |
| 10 | Ian Muir |
| 11 | Tony Thomas |
Substitutes used:
| 12 | David Fairclough (substituted in) 77' |
| 13 | Eddie Bishop (substituted in) 68' |
Manager:
Johnny King

== Post-match ==
The Tranmere manager Johnny King expressed his disappointment: "Our 65-match season has gone out of the window". His counterpart, Neil Warnock reflected on the financial impact of promotion, suggesting that Notts County "can now make ends meet next season".

Ten days after the Second Division play-off final, winners Swindon Town were found guilty on 35 counts of illegal player payments and were given a two-division relegation. Initially this meant that runners-up Sunderland were promoted to the First Division in Swindon's place, and Tranmere were promoted from the Third Division to the Second Division. Following an appeal, Swindon's penalty was reduced to a one-division relegation and Tranmere's promotion was revoked, the condemnation of which was heard in an early day motion sponsored primarily by Frank Field, the Labour Party MP for Birkenhead.

Notts County's next season saw them finish in fourth position in the Second Division and qualify for the play-offs. After beating Middlesbrough in the semi-final 2–1 on aggregate, they defeated Brighton & Hove Albion 3–1 in the final to gain back-to-back promotions. Tranmere Rovers ended their following season in fifth place in the Third Division to qualify for the play-offs, where they defeated Brentford 3–2 on aggregate in the semi-final and Bolton 1–0 in the final to secure promotion to the Second Division.
