= 1990 Associate Members' Cup final =

1990 Associate Members' Cup Final
- Event: 1989–90 Associate Members' Cup
Tranmere Rovers	Bristol Rovers
2	1
- Date: 20 May 1990
- Venue: Wembley Stadium, London
- Referee: Vic Callow (Solihull)
- Attendance: 48,402

The 1990 Associate Members' Cup Final, known as the Leyland DAF Cup for sponsorship reasons, was the 7th final of the domestic football cup competition for teams from the Third Division and Fourth Division. The final was played at Wembley Stadium, London on 20 May 1990, and was contested by Tranmere Rovers and Bristol Rovers. Tranmere won the match 2–1, with Ian Muir and Jim Steel scoring the goals for the winning team.

== Match details ==
20 May 1990

Tranmere Rovers	2–1	Bristol Rovers
Muir 9'; Steel 71'		White 55'

Wembley Stadium, London
Attendance: 48,402
Referee: Vic Callow (Solihull)

Tranmere Rovers	Bristol Rovers

GK
Substitutes:
Manager:
John King

Eric Nixon
Shaun Garnett
Steve Mungall
Neil McNab
Mark Hughes
Steve Vickers
Chris Malkin
Jim Harvey
Jim Steel
Ian Muir
Tony Thomas
Eddie Bishop
David Fairclough

Brian Parkin
Ian Alexander	(substituted off) 43'
Geoff Twentyman
Steve Yates
David Mehew
Vaughan Jones
Ian Holloway
Andy Reece
Devon White
Carl Saunders
Phil Purnell	(substituted off) 78'
Substitutes:
Paul Nixon	(substituted on) 43'
Christian McClean	(substituted on) 78'
Manager:
Gerry Francis
