= 1996–97 Tranmere Rovers F.C. season =

Tranmere Rovers
1996–97 season
- Chairman: Frank Corfe
- Manager: John Aldridge (player-manager)
- Stadium: Prenton Park
- First Division: 11th
- FA Cup: Third round
- League Cup: Second round
- Top goalscorer: League: John Aldridge (18); All: John Aldridge (20)
- Highest home attendance: 14,309 (vs. Bolton Wanderers, 4 May 1997)
- Lowest home attendance: 4,577 (vs. Oxford United, 1 October 1996)
- Average home league attendance: 8,170
Home colours

During the 1996–97 English football season, Tranmere Rovers F.C. competed in the Football League First Division.

== Season summary ==
Another decent season for Tranmere in player-manager John Aldridge's first full season in charge resulted in another mid-table finish, this time finishing two places higher than last season, in 11th.

== Final league table ==
Pos	Team	Pld	W	D	L	GF	GA	GD	Pts
9	Queens Park Rangers	46	18	12	16	64	60	+4	66
10	Birmingham City	46	17	15	14	52	48	+4	66
11	Tranmere Rovers	46	17	14	15	63	56	+7	65
12	Stoke City	46	18	10	18	51	57	−6	64
13	Norwich City	46	17	12	17	63	68	−5	63

Rules for classification: 1) Points; 2) Goals scored; 3) Goal difference

== Results ==
Tranmere Rovers' score comes first

=== Legend ===
Win	Draw	Loss

=== Football League First Division ===
Date	Opponent	Venue	Result	Attendance	Scorers
17 August 1996	Southend United	A	1–1	4,264	Morrissey
23 August 1996	Grimsby Town	H	3–2	6,800	Aldridge (2, 1 pen), Irons
27 August 1996	Port Vale	H	2–0	6,123	Mahon, Branch
31 August 1996	Bradford City	A	0–1	10,080	
7 September 1996	Birmingham City	H	1–0	8,548	Aldridge
10 September 1996	Huddersfield Town	A	1–0	10,181	Aldridge
14 September 1996	Swindon Town	A	1–2	8,430	Aldridge
21 September 1996	West Bromwich Albion	H	2–3	7,848	Aldridge, Branch
28 September 1996	Norwich City	A	1–1	14,511	Aldridge
1 October 1996	Oxford United	H	0–0	4,577	
4 October 1996	Portsmouth	H	4–3	5,001	Branch (2), G. Jones, Bonetti
12 October 1996	Sheffield United	A	0–0	15,059	
15 October 1996	Bolton Wanderers	A	0–1	14,136	
20 October 1996	Queens Park Rangers	H	2–3	7,025	Aldridge (pen), Brannan
26 October 1996	Ipswich Town	A	2–0	11,003	Brannan, Vaughan (own goal)
29 October 1996	Charlton Athletic	H	4–0	5,527	Thomas-Moore, G. Jones, Mahon, Aldridge
2 November 1996	Crystal Palace	H	1–3	8,613	Thorn
15 November 1996	Oldham Athletic	H	1–1	8,327	Aldridge
23 November 1996	Manchester City	A	2–1	26,531	Higgins, Brightwell (own goal)
30 November 1996	Ipswich Town	H	3–0	10,127	Brannan, Aldridge (2)
3 December 1996	Reading	A	0–2	5,513	
7 December 1996	Stoke City	A	0–2	9,931	
14 December 1996	Barnsley	A	0–3	8,513	
21 December 1996	Wolverhampton Wanderers	H	0–2	9,674	
26 December 1996	Huddersfield Town	H	1–1	10,134	Brannan
1 January 1997	West Bromwich Albion	A	2–1	14,770	Aldridge (2)
10 January 1997	Swindon Town	H	2–1	8,763	Nevin (2)
18 January 1997	Oxford United	A	1–2	7,072	Aldridge
28 January 1997	Norwich City	H	3–1	5,891	Cook (2), Thomas-Moore
1 February 1997	Reading	H	2–2	6,019	Branch, Thomas-Moore
7 February 1997	Charlton Athletic	A	1–3	11,283	Irons
22 February 1997	Crystal Palace	A	1–0	15,396	O'Brien
28 February 1997	Stoke City	H	0–0	9,127	
4 March 1997	Oldham Athletic	A	2–1	5,417	Brannan (2)
8 March 1997	Wolverhampton Wanderers	A	2–3	26,192	Irons, Aldridge
15 March 1997	Barnsley	H	1–1	7,347	Higgins
18 March 1997	Manchester City	H	1–1	12,019	G. Jones
22 March 1997	Grimsby Town	A	0–0	4,353	
28 March 1997	Southend United	H	3–0	7,563	Irons, L. Jones, Aldridge
31 March 1997	Port Vale	A	1–2	7,469	Irons
4 April 1997	Bradford City	H	3–0	8,531	G. Jones (2), L. Jones
12 April 1997	Portsmouth	A	3–1	12,004	Cook, G. Jones, L. Jones
15 April 1997	Birmingham City	A	0–0	22,364	
19 April 1997	Sheffield United	H	1–1	10,027	L. Jones
26 April 1997	Queens Park Rangers	A	0–2	14,859	
4 May 1997	Bolton Wanderers	H	2–2	14,309	Aldridge (pen), L. Jones

=== FA Cup ===
Round	Date	Opponent	Venue	Result	Attendance	Goalscorers
R3	14 January 1997	Carlisle United	A	0–1	10,090	

=== League Cup ===
Round	Date	Opponent	Venue	Result	Attendance	Goalscorers
R1 First Leg	21 August 1996	Shrewsbury Town	A	2–0	2,875	Aldridge, Bonetti
R1 Second Leg	3 September 1996	Shrewsbury Town	H	1–1 (won 3–1 on agg)	3,028	Branch
R2 First Leg	17 September 1996	Oldham Athletic	A	2–2	3,094	Aldridge (pen), Morrissey
R2 Second Leg	24 September 1996	Oldham Athletic	H	0–1	3,711	

== Squad ==
Note: Flags indicate national team as defined under FIFA eligibility rules; some limited exceptions apply. Players may hold more than one non-FIFA nationality.

No.	Pos.	Nation	Player
—	GK	(England) ENG	Eric Nixon
—	GK	(Wales) WAL	Danny Coyne
—	DF	(England) ENG	Dave Challinor
—	DF	(England) ENG	Dave Higgins
—	DF	(England) ENG	John McGreal
—	DF	(England) ENG	Alan Rogers
—	DF	(England) ENG	Gary Stevens
—	DF	(England) ENG	Shaun Teale
—	DF	(England) ENG	Tony Thomas
—	DF	(England) ENG	Andy Thorn
—	DF	(Wales) WAL	Alan Morgan
—	DF	(Scotland) SCO	Steve Mungall
—	MF	(England) ENG	Graham Branch
—	MF	(England) ENG	Ged Brannan

No.	Pos.	Nation	Player
—	MF	(England) ENG	Paul Cook
—	MF	(England) ENG	Kenny Irons
—	MF	(England) ENG	Gary Jones
—	MF	(Republic of Ireland) IRL	Alan Mahon
—	MF	(England) ENG	Kevin McIntyre
—	MF	(Republic of Ireland) IRL	Liam O'Brien
—	MF	(Republic of Ireland) IRL	Billy Woods
—	MF	(Italy) ITA	Ivano Bonetti
—	FW	(England) ENG	John Morrissey
—	FW	(England) ENG	Ian Thomas-Moore
—	FW	(Wales) WAL	Lee Jones
—	FW	(Scotland) SCO	Pat Nevin
—	FW	(Republic of Ireland) IRL	John Aldridge
