= John McGreal =

English footballer (born 1972)

Personal information
- Full name: John Leslie McGreal
- Date of birth: 2 June 1972 (age 54)
- Place of birth: Liverpool, England
- Height: 1.85 m (6 ft 1 in)
- Position: Defender

Team information
- Current team: Ipswich Town (U21s Coach)

Youth career
- 1989–1990: Tranmere Rovers

Senior career*
Years	Team	Apps	(Gls)
1990–1999	Tranmere Rovers	195	(1)
1999–2004	Ipswich Town	123	(4)
2004–2007	Burnley	96	(1)
Total		414	(6)

Managerial career
- 2015: Colchester United (caretaker)
- 2016–2020: Colchester United
- 2021: Swindon Town
- 2021–: Ipswich U21s
- 2021: Ipswich Town (caretaker)
- * Club domestic league appearances and goals

John Leslie McGreal (born 2 June 1972) is an English football manager and former professional footballer who is an U21s coach at Ipswich Town.

He began his career at Tranmere Rovers, making his debut in the 1991–92 season. He became a first-team regular from the 1993–94 season, playing a total of 233 games across eight seasons, until he was sold to Ipswich Town for a £750,000 fee in August 1999. He helped his new club to win promotion into the Premier League with victory in the 2000 play-off final. He played 54 Premier League games in two seasons, before Ipswich were relegated back into the First Division in 2002. He stayed with the club for another two years before signing with Burnley in June 2004. He spent three seasons in the Championship with Burnley, being named as Player of the Year in 2005, and retired at the end of the 2006–07 season. He played a total of 489 league and cup games in 16 seasons as a professional in the English Football League and Premier League, scoring seven goals.

McGreal went into coaching after retiring as a player, joining the Colchester United Academy in 2009. He briefly stood in as the first team's caretaker-manager in November 2015, before being given the job on a permanent basis following the club's relegation out of League One in May 2016. He took charge for four seasons, with the club twice finishing one place outside the League Two play-offs and losing in the play-off semi-finals at the end of the 2019–20 season. He was sacked in July 2020. After a brief stint as Swindon Town boss, McGreal rejoined Ipswich Town in December 2021 as a coach for the U23s (now the U21s) and development squad.

== Playing career ==
=== Tranmere Rovers ===
Born in Liverpool, McGreal began his career with local club Tranmere Rovers at the age of 17 and moved from Warwick Rimmer's youth-team to the first-team set-up under John King in 1990. He scored his first and only goal for the club on 23 February 1994, in a 1–1 draw with Leicester City at Filbert Street. However he also scored the equalising goal for Leicester with an own goal when he sliced in Ian Ormondroyd's header, which would otherwise have gone wide. He played 27 games in the 1996–97 season as Tranmere finished 11th in the First Division under the stewardship of John Aldridge. He missed just four league games during the following campaign as Rovers posted a 14th-place finish. He featured 42 times in the 1998–99 season, helping Tranmere to another mid-table finish, in his final season at Prenton Park.

=== Ipswich Town ===
In the summer of 1999, with Huddersfield Town manager Steve Bruce and Ipswich Town manager George Burley both interested in signing McGreal, he opted to sign for the Suffolk club after a £650,000 offer (rising by two further instalments of £50,000 after 30 and 60 games) was accepted by Tranmere. He was signed as a long-term replacement for Tony Mowbray. McGreal made his Ipswich debut on 7 August 1999, in a 3–1 win over Nottingham Forest at Portman Road. He received his first red card in only his eighth match for the club on 11 September, during a 1–1 draw with Portsmouth. He helped the team reach the play-off final at Wembley, where they beat Barnsley 4–2 to earn promotion to the Premier League.

In his third Premier League match for Ipswich, McGreal scored his first goal for the club with the opener in a 3–0 win over Everton at Goodison Park in a season which saw Ipswich climb the league table to ultimately finish fifth and earn a place in the 2001–02 UEFA Cup. He scored his second goal with the winner in a 2–1 victory over Tottenham Hotspur on 12 January 2002, but he couldn't help halt the side's slide down the league as they finished the 2001–02 season in 18th-place and were relegated back to the First Division.

The following season saw Ipswich once again playing in the UEFA Cup having qualified through the UEFA Respect Fair Play ranking, as McGreal scored in his first game of the new campaign as Town defeated Avenir Beggen 8–1 at Portman Road in the qualifying round second leg match on 29 August 2002. He scored once more in an injury-affected season with the opener in a 2–2 draw against Burnley, but could only muster 22 appearances all season. Another injury-hit season followed, where he missed much of the start of the season but returned to help Ipswich reach the play-offs, but they were defeated over two legs by West Ham United. McGreal scored once during the 2003–04 season, in a 1–1 draw with Reading on 10 January. McGreal left the club in the summer in search of a longer contract offer elsewhere and manager Joe Royle said that "I never wanted to lose him and of the eight players that left the club in the summer he was my biggest regret".

=== Burnley ===
McGreal refused the offer of a new deal to remain with Ipswich in the summer of 2004 and instead opted to sign for Burnley on a three-year deal. Manager Steve Cotterill described McGreal as "one of the best defenders in the First Division". He made his debut for the side on 7 August 2004 in a 1–1 home draw with Sheffield United, before scoring what was to be his only goal for Burnley in a 3–0 win over Crewe Alexandra at Turf Moor on 11 September. He formed an excellent centre-back partnership with Frank Sinclair and made 45 appearances in his first season with the "Clarets". He made a further 38 in his second, while he could only manage 23 first-team appearances during 2006–07 in a season again affected by injury.

After leaving Burnley at the end of the 2006–07 season, McGreal returned south, briefly joining Championship side Colchester United on trial, but manager Geraint Williams decided against offering the player a contract. He then returned to the Ipswich area, and following advice from Town manager and his ex-teammate Jim Magilton, he studied for his UEFA B Licence.

== Style of play ==
McGreal was a "calm, cultured" defender in the mould of Alan Hansen.

== Coaching career ==
=== Colchester United ===
After ex-Ipswich academy boss Tony Humes was appointed head of youth at Colchester United in 2009, McGreal joined the club's Academy as a professional development coach. He was later appointed manager of the under-18 side alongside his former Ipswich teammate Wayne Brown, and led the side to the Football League Youth Alliance South East title and won the Youth Alliance Cup in April 2014. Following Richard Hall's promotion to assistant manager in September 2014, McGreal stepped up to replace Hall as under-21s manager.

McGreal was named as interim manager at Colchester United alongside Richard Hall following Tony Humes dismissal as manager on 26 November 2015. However, following a 5–1 defeat against Burton Albion in his only match in charge, he was appointed assistant to Wayne Brown, who was named caretaker manager on 2 December. Following Kevin Keen's appointment as permanent Colchester manager, McGreal reverted to his former role as under-21 coach.

After Kevin Keen left Colchester following the club's relegation to League Two on 26 April 2016, McGreal was appointed his successor on 4 May. He did not take charge of Colchester until after the final game of the 2015–16 season, in which his assistant Steve Ball was named caretaker. The club signed a number of players in preparation for the 2016–17 season, including defenders Luke Prosser (who he appointed as captain) and Lewis Kinsella; midfielders Brennan Dickenson, Craig Slater and Doug Loft; and forwards Courtney Senior, Kurtis Guthrie, and Denny Johnstone. However top-scorer George Moncur was sold to Barnsley for £500,000. In his first match in charge on 6 August, McGreal guided his side to a 1–1 opening day draw away to Hartlepool United. He earned his first win on 13 August as his side defeated Cambridge United 2–0 at the Colchester Community Stadium. After three wins and one draw in Colchester's opening five league fixtures, McGreal was nominated for the League Two Manager of the Month award for August. After an eleven-game winless run, McGreal's side went undefeated in December, earning ten points from a possible twelve which propelled Colchester up the League Two table away from the relegation zone. In turn, McGreal was shortlisted for the League Two Manager of the Month award for December. He won the award on 6 January 2017, becoming the first Colchester manager to win the award since Paul Lambert in January 2009. Later that month he signed Sean Murray on a free transfer from Swindon Town. The "U's" finished the season eighth in the table, one place and one point behind Blackpool in the play-offs, who would go on to achieve promotion. McGreal released eight players, whilst also losing top-scorer Chris Porter, who left on a free transfer to sign with Crewe Alexandra.

Needing to find a new goalscorer for the 2017–18 season, McGreal signed Mikael Mandron from Wigan Athletic for an undisclosed fee. He also brought in goalkeeper Rene Gilmartin and midfielder Ryan Jackson. He made a series of loan signings to bolster the squad, which included the arrivals of Ryan Inniss, Brandon Comley, Kyel Reid and Brandon Hanlan. Colchester got off to a poor start, but improved and collected ten points from five games to earn McGreal another Manager of the Month nomination in October. The young side's good form continued into December, where they picked up 11 points from a possible 15 to earn him yet another Manager of the Month nomination. However they struggled in the second half of the campaign, despite holding on to top-scorer Sammie Szmodics in the January transfer window, and ended the season in 13th-place. McGreal released four senior players and seven from the U-23 team. Sam Walker and Sean Murray also departed after failing to agree new deals.

McGreal strengthened his front-line for the 2018–19 season, signing midfielder Harry Pell (undisclosed six-figure fee) and strikers Frank Nouble (free transfer) and Luke Norris (undisclosed fee). Colchester enjoyed a strong first half of the campaign, and a 1–0 win at Milton Keynes Dons saw them head into Christmas in the automatic promotion places. He signed Ben Stevenson on a permanent basis in January. However the promotion campaign faltered, and despite beating champions Lincoln City on the final day, Colchester ended in eighth-place, a point outside the play-offs. He released Mikael Mandron in the summer, along with Ryan Gondoh. However he lost a series of players who turned down new contract offers: Brennan Dickenson, Sam Saunders, Rene Gilmartin and Dillon Barnes; whilst Frankie Kent, Sammie Szmodics and Kane Vincent-Young were sold on to other clubs.

He signed a number of young players to replace those that had departed: Kwame Poku, Luke Gambin, Omar Sowunmi, Jevani Brown, Cohen Bramall and Callum Harriott. More senior players Paris Cowan-Hall and Dean Gerken were also signed, whilst Theo Robinson joined on a season-long loan from Southend United. Having made an indifferent start to the 2019–20 League Two season, Colchester entered the play-offs for the first time with a 3–1 win at Leyton Orient on Boxing day. The team reached the quarter-finals of the EFL Cup, eliminating both Crystal Palace and Tottenham Hotspur on penalties after holding both Premier League teams to 0–0 draws. In the quarter-finals they were beaten 3–0 by Manchester United at Old Trafford. The season ended early due to the COVID-19 pandemic in England and the table was decided on points per game with Colchester in the play-offs in sixth-place. However the club announced that 16 players would be released at their end of their contracts, with chairman Robbie Cowling admitting that he "would have been determined to re-sign" Brandon Comley, Ryan Jackson, Frank Nouble and Luke Prosser in normal circumstances. Colchester lost out to Exeter City after extra-time in the play-off semi-finals and McGreal was subsequently dismissed by the club on 14 July 2020 as Cowling felt that "significant changes are required that will be best served with a new head coach". McGreal said he was "deeply saddened" with the decision to end his 11-year association with the club and that "the memories of this season will live with me forever".

=== Swindon Town ===
On 26 May 2021, McGreal was appointed manager of recently relegated League Two side Swindon Town, but on 25 June, after less than a month in the job, McGreal left Swindon by mutual consent, as ownership issues prevented him signing new players.

=== Ipswich Town ===
On 2 December 2021, McGreal returned to Ipswich Town, a club he made 150 appearances for, in a coaching role that would see him work with the U23s and Development squads. Just four days later, following the sacking of manager Paul Cook, McGreal was named as interim manager. McGreal oversaw 4 games in charge, drawing 2 and losing 2, before new manager Kieran McKenna was appointed. McGreal then returned to his previous role with the clubs' U23s before they became the U21s at the start of the 2022/23 season.

== Management style ==
McGreal has a reputation for playing "attacking, free-flowing" football with a "fluid 4–2–3–1 system". He is able to work alongside a director of football or head of recruitment and work with and develop a young squad.

== Career statistics ==
=== Playing statistics ===
Appearances and goals by club, season and competition
Club	Season	League			FA Cup		League Cup		Other		Total	
Club	Season	Division	Apps	Goals	Apps	Goals	Apps	Goals	Apps	Goals	Apps	Goals
Tranmere Rovers	1991–92	Second Division	3	0	0	0	0	0	0	0	3	0
Tranmere Rovers	1992–93	First Division	0	0	0	0	0	0	1 (Note: Appearance in the Anglo-Italian Cup)	0	1	0
Tranmere Rovers	1993–94	First Division	15	1	0	0	2	0	2 (Note: Appearances in the First Division play-offs)	0	19	1
Tranmere Rovers	1994–95	First Division	43	0	2	0	3	0	6 (Note: Four appearances in the Anglo-Italian Cup, two in the First Division play-offs)	0	54	0
Tranmere Rovers	1995–96	First Division	32	0	1	0	4	0	—		37	0
Tranmere Rovers	1996–97	First Division	24	0	1	0	2	0	—		27	0
Tranmere Rovers	1997–98	First Division	42	0	3	0	5	0	—		50	0
Tranmere Rovers	1998–99	First Division	36	0	1	0	5	0	—		42	0
Tranmere Rovers	Total		195	1	8	0	21	0	9	0	233	1
Ipswich Town	1999–2000	First Division	34	0	1	0	4	0	1	0	40	0
Ipswich Town	2000–01	Premier League	28	1	1	0	5	0	—		34	1
Ipswich Town	2001–02	Premier League	27	1	1	0	2	0	3 (Note: Appearances in the UEFA Cup)	0	33	1
Ipswich Town	2002–03	First Division	16	1	0	0	1	0	5	1	22	2
Ipswich Town	2003–04	First Division	18	1	2	0	0	0	1	0	21	1
Ipswich Town	Total		123	4	5	0	12	0	10	1	150	5
Burnley	2004–05	Championship	39	1	3	0	3	0	—		45	1
Burnley	2005–06	Championship	35	0	1	0	2	0	—		38	0
Burnley	2006–07	Championship	22	0	1	0	0	0	—		23	0
Burnley	Total		96	1	5	0	5	0	—		106	1
Career total			414	6	18	0	38	0	19	1	489	7

=== Managerial statistics ===
As of match played 18 December 2021

Managerial record by team and tenure
Team	From	To	Record				
Team	From	To	P	W	D	L	Win %
Colchester United (caretaker)	26 November 2015	2 December 2015	1	0	0	1	0.0
Colchester United	9 May 2016	14 July 2020	202	76	55	71	37.6
Swindon Town	26 May 2021	25 June 2021	0	0	0	0	—
Ipswich Town (interim)	6 December 2021	20 December 2021	4	0	2	2	0.0
Total			207	76	57	74	36.7

== Honours ==
=== As a Player ===
Ipswich Town

- Football League First Division play-offs: 2000

Individual

- Burnley Player of the Year: 2004–05

=== As a Manager ===
Individual

- EFL League Two Manager of the Month: December 2016
