= Supersub =

Supersub may mean:

- Supersub, a cricket term for a type of substitute player/player substitution.
- Super-sub, an association football term referging to a player who is noted for often coming on as a substitute and making a significant impact on the match.
- super-submarine sandwich, a larger, longer or more stuffed hero sandwich.
- a super-submarine, a superior underwater vehicle.
  - Japanese supersub, the World War II-era I-400 class submarine
  - Narco supersub, the true-submarines (as opposed to semi-subs) for narcotics smuggling, see narco submarine
- Supersub, a nickname of David Fairclough (born 1957), English footballer
