= 1993–94 Tranmere Rovers F.C. season =

Tranmere Rovers
1993–94 season
- Manager: John King
- Stadium: Prenton Park
- First Division: 5th
- Play-offs: Semi-finals
- FA Cup: Third round
- League Cup: Semi-finals
- Anglo-Italian Cup: Qualifying round
Home colours	Third colours

The 1993–94 season was Tranmere Rovers Football Club's 109th year in existence and 2nd consecutive season the second division of English football.

== Summary ==
John Aldridge starred for Tranmere Rovers F.C. as they reached the Coca-Cola Cup semi finals in 1993–94. Tranmere were early First Division leaders after winning seven of their opening eleven matches, and regained first position in mid-December following three straight wins. John King's side defeated Oxford United 6–2, Grimsby Town 4–1, Oldham Athletic 3–0 and Nottingham Forest 2–0 in the Coca-Cola Cup, before losing on penalties to Aston Villa after a 4–4 draw in the semi-finals. They faltered in the promotion race, but qualified for the play-offs after five wins in six games, losing 2–1 to Leicester City in the semi-finals.

== Competitions ==
=== League table ===
Pos	Team	Pld	W	D	L	GF	GA	GD	Pts	Qualification or relegation
3	Millwall	46	19	17	10	58	49	+9	74	Qualification for the First Division play-offs
4	Leicester City (O, P)	46	19	16	11	72	59	+13	73	Qualification for the First Division play-offs
5	Tranmere Rovers	46	21	9	16	69	53	+16	72	Qualification for the First Division play-offs
6	Derby County	46	20	11	15	73	68	+5	71	Qualification for the First Division play-offs
7	Notts County	46	20	8	18	65	69	−4	68	

Source: rsssf.com
Rules for classification: 1) Points; 2) Goals scored; 3) Goal difference
(O) Play-off winners; (P) Promoted

=== FA Cup ===
8 January 1994 Third round	Oxford United	2–0	Tranmere Rovers	Oxford
		Report		Stadium: Manor Ground

=== League Cup ===
21 September 1993 Second round 1st leg	Tranmere Rovers	5–1	Oxford United	Birkenhead
		Report		Stadium: Prenton Park; Attendance: 3,473

5 October 1993 Second round 2nd leg	Oxford United	1–1 (2–6 agg.)	Tranmere Rovers	Oxford
		Report		Stadium: Manor Ground

26 October 1993 Third round	Tranmere Rovers	4–1	Grimsby Town	Birkenhead
		Report		Stadium: Prenton Park; Attendance: 5,204

30 November 1993 Fourth round	Tranmere Rovers	3–0	Oldham Athletic	Birkenhead
		Report		Stadium: Prenton Park; Attendance: 9,477

26 January 1994 Quarter-finals	Nottingham Forest	1–1	Tranmere Rovers	Nottingham
		Report		Stadium: City Ground; Attendance: 20,066

29 January 1994 Quarter-finals replay	Tranmere Rovers	2–0	Nottingham Forest	Birkenhead
		Report		Stadium: Prenton Park; Attendance: 12,578

16 February 1994 Semi-finals 1st leg	Tranmere Rovers	3–1	Aston Villa	Birkenhead
	Aldridge; Hughes; Nolan	Report	Atkinson	Stadium: Prenton Park; Attendance: 17,140

27 February 1994 Semi-finals 2nd leg	Aston Villa	3–1 (a.e.t.) (4–4 agg.) (5–4 p)	Tranmere Rovers	Birmingham
	Saunders; Atkinson; Teale	Report	Aldridge (pen.)	Stadium: Villa Park; Attendance: 71,654

=== Anglo-Italian Cup ===
31 August 1993 Qualifying round	Sunderland	2–0	Tranmere Rovers	Sunderland
		Report		Stadium: Stadium of Light; Attendance: 6,771

7 September 1993 Qualifying round	Tranmere Rovers	1–2	Bolton Wanderers	Birkenhead
		Report		Stadium: Prenton Park; Attendance: 2,786
