= John Gayle (footballer) =

English footballer (born 1964)

Personal information
- Date of birth: 30 July 1964 (age 62)
- Place of birth: Bromsgrove, England
- Height: 6 ft 2 in (1.88 m)
- Position: Striker

Senior career*
Years	Team	Apps	(Gls)
1980–1981	Alvechurch		
1981	Highgate United		
1981–1982	Tamworth		
1982–1983	Stratford Town		
1983–1984	Solihull Borough		
1984–198?	Sutton Coldfield Town		
198?–1987	Mile Oak Rovers		
1987–1988	Bromsgrove Rovers		
1988–1989	Burton Albion	27	(11)
1989–1990	Wimbledon	20	(2)
1990–1993	Birmingham City	44	(10)
1993	→ Walsall (loan)	4	(1)
1993–1994	Coventry City	3	(0)
1994–1995	Burnley	14	(3)
1995–1997	Stoke City	26	(4)
1996	→ Gillingham (loan)	9	(3)
1997–1998	Northampton Town	48	(8)
1998–1999	Scunthorpe United	49	(4)
1999–2000	Shrewsbury Town	19	(2)
2000–2001	Torquay United	13	(1)
2001–2002	Moor Green	39	(9)
Total		288	(47)

Managerial career
- 2006–2008: Totnes & Dartington
- * Club domestic league appearances and goals

John Gayle (born 30 July 1964) is an English former professional footballer who played as a striker for Wimbledon, Birmingham City, Walsall, Coventry City, Burnley, Stoke City, Gillingham, Northampton Town, Scunthorpe United, Shrewsbury Town and Torquay United.

== Career ==
Gayle was born in Bromsgrove, Worcestershire. A powerful target-man centre forward, he worked in a printers and on a building site before beginning his professional career. He played for a number of non-league teams, Alvechurch, Highgate United, Tamworth, Stratford Town, Solihull Borough, Sutton Coldfield Town and Mile Oak Rovers, before joining his hometown club, Bromsgrove Rovers in late 1987. He followed Bromsgrove manager Bobby Hope to Burton Albion in 1988, from where he and Steve Cotterill joined Wimbledon in February 1989.

In November 1990, after only 20 league games and 2 goals for Wimbledon and following an alleged training ground bust-up with Keith Curle, Gayle moved to Birmingham City for £175,000, helping the Blues to promotion in 1992. He played for Birmingham City against Tranmere Rovers in the 1991 Associate Members' Cup Final at Wembley scoring twice in their 3–2 victory with the winning goal scored from a spectacular overhead kick. He moved to Walsall on loan in August 1993, making 4 league appearances, scoring 1 goal. A day after the end of his loan spell, on 13 September 1993, Gayle was back in the top flight, Coventry City paying £100,000 for his services. He had scored 10 goals in 44 league games for Birmingham, but failed to settle at Highfield Road, making only 5 league appearances without scoring before being transferred on to Burnley on 17 August 1994 for £70,000.

This again proved to be only a short stay, Gayle making 14 league appearances and scoring 3 goals before moving to Stoke City for £70,000 on 23 January 1995. He moved to Gillingham on loan on 14 March 1996, making 9 league appearances and scoring 3 goals which helped secure the club's promotion from Division Three. The following season, Gayle was on the move again, joining Northampton Town on 10 February 1997 for a fee of £25,000. He had played 26 times in the league for Stoke, scoring 4 goals, with almost half of his appearances as a substitute.

He remained at Northampton for over a year, scoring 7 times in 48 league games, before joining Scunthorpe United on a free transfer on 16 June 1998. 4 goals in 49 league games followed for the Iron, before he was on the move yet again, this time a free transfer taking him to Shrewsbury Town on 25 November 1999. Gayle played a role in keeping the Shrews in the league, injuries limiting him to 19 league games in which he scored twice.

On 14 December 2000, Gayle was released by Shrewsbury, joining a Torquay United side in need of a target man that up to that time under manager Wes Saunders they had never really had. He made his Torquay league debut on 16 December 2000 against Hull City at Boothferry Park, a rare 2–1 away win for the Gulls, but injured his hamstring during the game and was out for the next month. By the time he returned, Torquay were deeper in trouble at the foot of the league, but Gayle played his part in ensuring survival, appearing mainly as a substitute to add weight to Torquay's lightweight attack late in the game.

However, when he came on as a late substitute in the relegation decider at Barnet on 5 May 2001, he missed several chances to put the game beyond Barnet's reach, or at least test their goalkeeper, only adding to the anxiety of the fans in the away end. It was no surprise that Gayle was released by Colin Lee in May 2001, joining non-league Moor Green where he ended his playing career.

John Gayle subsequently took up a coaching role at a school in Birmingham by the name of Washwood Heath Technology College, a predominantly working-class school with a massive Asian influence, during which time he gave out training sessions in many areas of football and credit to the footballer for reaching out to the ethnic minorities of Birmingham.

In July 2006 Gayle was appointed manager of Devon League side Totnes and Dartington Sports Club. Prior to his appointment, he had been working for the Prince's Trust in Birmingham. In the summer of 2008 he left Totnes and Dartington to be appointed as first team manager at Newton Abbot.

== Court proceedings ==
In January 1998 a lawsuit was issued against Gayle by former Bolton Wanderers defender Nicky Spooner. Spooner was playing for Bolton in a game against Burnley at Turf Moor in October 1994 when Gayle clattered into the player severely breaking his right leg and leaving him out of the professional game for three seasons.

The tackle all but ended the future career of Spooner and he had to have a number of operations on the injury as well as a bone graft.

At the time of the writs being issued Spooner had the following to say to the Bolton Evening News: "I've missed three fantastic years with Bolton, including promotion to the Premiership twice. I'm playing again now but it's just like starting from scratch. That tackle wrecked my career."

A "substantial" compensation sum, believed to be six figures, was settled out of court in April 2000.

== Career statistics ==
Appearances and goals by club, season and competition
Club	Season	League			FA Cup		League Cup		Other^{[A]}		Total	
Club	Season	Division	Apps	Goals	Apps	Goals	Apps	Goals	Apps	Goals	Apps	Goals
Wimbledon	1988–89	First Division	2	0	0	0	0	0	0	0	2	0
Wimbledon	1989–90	First Division	11	1	0	0	1	0	0	0	12	1
Wimbledon	1990–91	First Division	7	1	0	0	2	0	0	0	9	1
Wimbledon	Total		20	2	0	0	3	0	0	0	23	2
Birmingham City	1990–91	Third Division	22	6	1	0	0	0	6	4	29	10
Birmingham City	1991–92	Third Division	3	1	0	0	0	0	0	0	3	1
Birmingham City	1992–93	First Division	19	3	1	0	0	0	3	0	23	3
Birmingham City	Total		44	10	2	0	0	0	9	4	55	14
Walsall (loan)	1993–94	Third Division	4	1	0	0	0	0	0	0	4	1
Coventry City	1993–94	Premier League	3	0	0	0	3	0	0	0	6	0
Burnley	1994–95	First Division	14	3	2	1	2	1	0	0	18	5
Stoke City	1994–95	First Division	4	0	0	0	0	0	2	0	6	0
Stoke City	1995–96	First Division	10	3	1	0	0	0	2	0	13	3
Stoke City	1996–97	First Division	12	1	0	0	0	0	2	0	14	1
Stoke City	Total		26	4	1	0	0	0	6	0	33	4
Gillingham (loan)	1995–96	Third Division	9	3	0	0	0	0	0	0	9	3
Northampton Town	1996–97	Third Division	13	1	0	0	0	0	5	2	18	3
Northampton Town	1997–98	Second Division	35	6	4	0	2	2	5	1	46	9
Northampton Town	Total		48	7	4	0	2	2	10	3	64	12
Scunthorpe United	1998–99	Third Division	37	4	1	0	2	0	4	0	44	4
Scunthorpe United	1999–2000	Second Division	12	0	0	0	1	0	0	0	13	0
Scunthorpe United	Total		49	4	1	0	3	0	4	0	57	4
Shrewsbury Town	1999–2000	Third Division	18	2	0	0	0	0	1	0	19	2
Shrewsbury Town	2000–01	Third Division	1	0	0	0	0	0	0	0	1	0
Shrewsbury Town	Total		19	2	0	0	0	0	1	0	20	2
Torquay United	2000–01	Third Division	13	1	0	0	0	0	0	0	13	1
Career total			249	37	10	1	13	3	30	7	302	48

A. The "Other" column constitutes appearances and goals in the Anglo-Italian Cup, Football League Trophy and Football League play-offs.

== Honours ==
Birmingham City

- Associate Members' Cup: 1990–91

Northampton Town

- Football League Third Division play-offs: 1997

Scunthorpe United

- Football League Third Division play-offs: 1999
