= Gary Scott (footballer) =

English footballer

Personal information
- Full name: Gary Craig Scott
- Date of birth: 3 February 1978 (age 48)
- Place of birth: Liverpool, England
- Height: 5 ft 8 in (1.73 m)
- Position: Defender

Youth career
- 1994–1997: Tranmere Rovers

Senior career*
Years	Team	Apps	(Gls)
1997–1999	Rotherham United	20	(0)
2000	Leigh RMI	8	(0)
2000–2008	Altrincham	296	(9)
- * Club domestic league appearances and goals as of 28 November 2007

Gary Craig Scott (born 3 February 1978) is an English footballer, who was last attached to Altrincham.

Scott made his debut for Altrincham on 3 October 2000, against Stalybridge Celtic.

== Honours ==
=== Club ===
Leigh RMI

- Peter Swales Challenge Shield (1): 1999–2000
