= David Fairclough =

English footballer (born 1957)

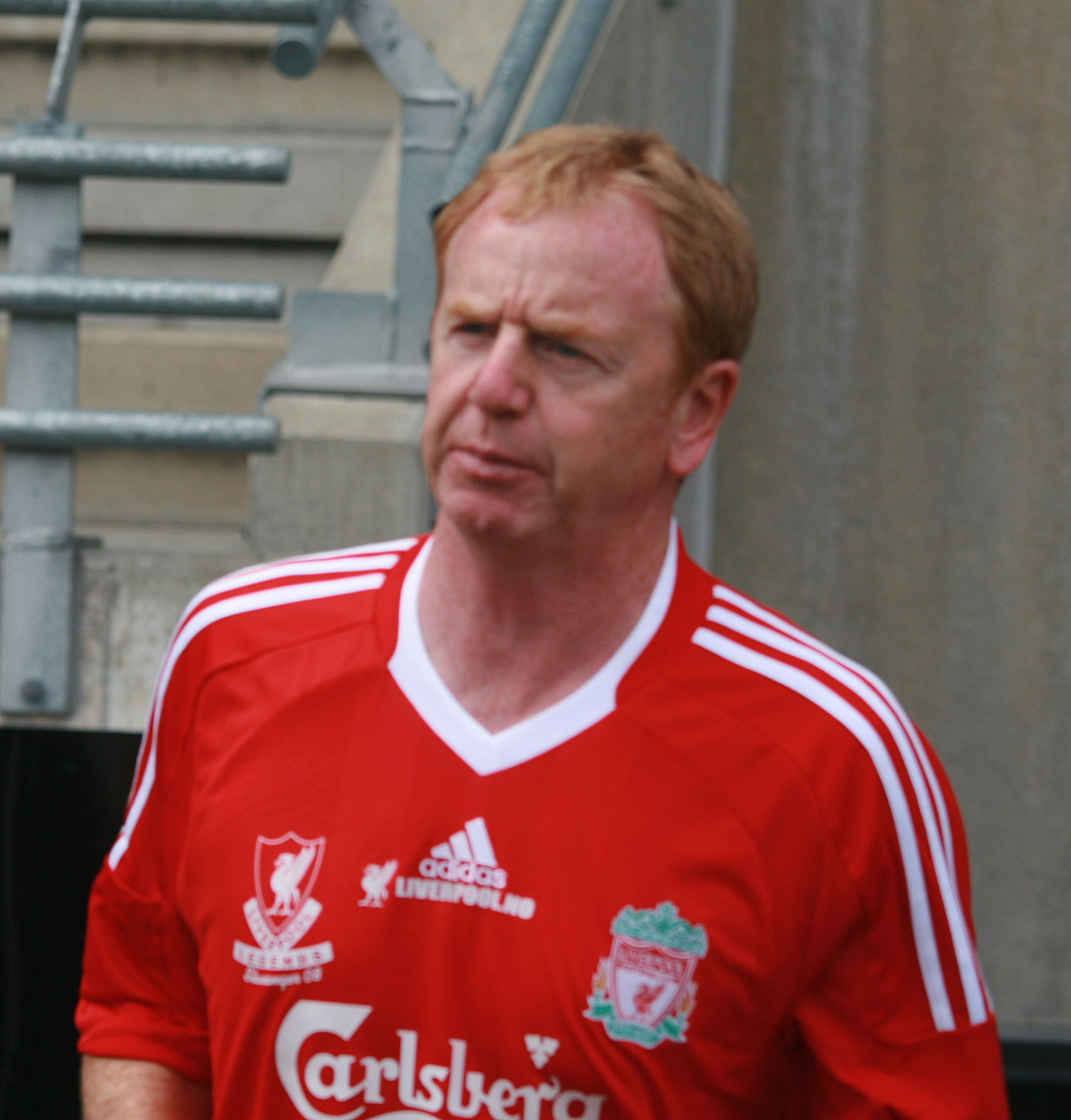
- Fairclough in 2008

Personal information
- Date of birth: 5 January 1957 (age 69)
- Place of birth: Liverpool, England
- Position: Striker

Youth career
- 1973–1975: Liverpool

Senior career*
Years	Team	Apps	(Gls)
1975–1983	Liverpool	98	(34)
1982	→ Toronto Blizzard	20	(4)
1983–1985	Luzern	40	(8)
1985	Manchester City	0	(0)
1985	Norwich City	2	(0)
1985–1986	Oldham Athletic	17	(1)
1986	Rochdale	0	(0)
1986–1989	Beveren	70	(14)
1989–1990	Tranmere Rovers	14	(1)
1990–1991	Wigan Athletic	7	(1)
Total		268	(63)

International career
1976	England U21	1	(0)
1978	England B	1	(1)
- * Club domestic league appearances and goals

David Fairclough (born 5 January 1957) is an English retired professional footballer, most famous for playing for Liverpool as a striker during the 1970s and 1980s.

== Life and playing career ==
Known affectionately as Supersub (because he was a talented goalscorer who, in comparison with other players, rarely started matches for Liverpool – but frequently came into the match as a substitute to make an impact), Fairclough was born in inner city Liverpool and as a child moved to the new Cantril Farm housing estate in the 1960s due to slum clearances. He rose through the Liverpool ranks as a teenager and made his debut for the club on 1 November 1975 in the 1–0 league win over Middlesbrough at Ayresome Park. As the season progressed, Fairclough scored seven crucial goals in just 14 appearances to land Liverpool the League championship. Nine of these appearances were as substitute. His first goal for the club came three days after his debut on 4 November 1975, during the 6–0 defeat of Spanish side Real Sociedad at Anfield in a UEFA Cup 2nd round 2nd leg tie.

The pecking order of strikers at the club saw Fairclough trailing behind the 'dream duo' of Kevin Keegan and John Toshack, as well as England centre forward David Johnson. In the 1976–77 season, Fairclough made more appearances as a substitute, because of a succession of injuries to Toshack.

His most famous Liverpool goal came at Anfield as a substitute in a crucial European Cup quarter final against the French side St Etienne. Liverpool had been a goal adrift from the first leg in France, and when they went 2–1 up in the home return, the aggregate score was level at 2–2 but St Etienne led on the away goals rule. Liverpool's manager Bob Paisley sent Fairclough on in the last 20 minutes of the game and with six minutes remaining, Fairclough ran on to a long ball upfield and held off two St Etienne defenders to score the tie's decisive goal at the Kop end. ITV commentator Gerald Sinstadt remarked: "Supersub strikes again!"

Liverpool won the League title again and reached both the FA Cup final at Wembley and the European Cup final in Rome. Fairclough was not selected for the Wembley squad as Paisley named veteran winger Ian Callaghan as the substitute, and Liverpool lost to Manchester United. However, he was a substitute in Rome as Liverpool won 3–1.

The following season, Fairclough scored a goal in each leg as Liverpool thrashed Keegan's Hamburger SV 7–1 on aggregate in the European Super Cup. Liverpool reached the European Cup final again and this time Fairclough started the match. A 1–0 victory over Bruges retained the trophy for Liverpool. He managed 29 league appearances that season, scoring 10 goals, but the Reds were beaten to both the league title and the Football League Cup by newly promoted Nottingham Forest under Brian Clough.

In 1978–79, Liverpool regained their league championship crown but Fairclough did not play enough games to seal another title medal, as he had played just four times in the league, scoring twice.

Fairclough scored his only Liverpool hat-trick on 9 February 1980 in the thrilling 5–3 league victory over Norwich City at Carrow Road. His goals came in the 4th, 18th and 75th minutes, with Kenny Dalglish and Jimmy Case scoring to guarantee a late win for the Reds. However, Fairclough's league chances were again restricted that season, as he played just 14 league games and scored five goals. He came on as a substitute in the League Cup semi final second leg against Nottingham Forest four days after his hat trick at Norwich, and scored a late equaliser to preserve Liverpool's long two-year unbeaten run at Anfield. Even though Liverpool went out on aggregate to Forest, Fairclough's goal helped create an English record of eighty five unbeaten matches in succession at home.

Fairclough spent another five years at Anfield, although in what was a golden era for the club, he was rarely in the first team. He was a prolific scorer in the reserves, but the phenomenal partnership of Dalglish and Ian Rush rendered him surplus to first team requirements. In the 1982–83 season he scored three times in eight league appearances but failed to play enough games to merit a title medal. He had also failed to make the squad for the League Cup victories of the previous two seasons, and in the 1981–82 season, when the Reds won another league title as well as the League Cup, he did not play a single first team game.

The Supersub tag belied the number of first team starts Fairclough made at Liverpool; of his 153 appearances, only 61 were from the bench. He scored 55 goals (34 of them in the league), averaging a goal every 2.8 games.

Fairclough left Liverpool on 4 July 1983 after a loan spell at NASL side Toronto Blizzard. He then moved to the Swiss side FC Lucerne before returning to England for spells with Manchester City, Norwich, Oldham Athletic and Rochdale. He moved overseas once more to Belgium club Beveren for three seasons before returning home for stints with Tranmere Rovers and Wigan Athletic. He ended his playing days at non-league Knowsley.

== Later life and legacy ==
Fairclough now works as a pundit and also on the after-dinner circuit.

Fairclough is still a firm favourite amongst the Anfield faithful and was voted in at No.18 on the 2006 poll 100 Players Who Shook The Kop. The poll was conducted by the Reds official web-site, 110,000 supporters worldwide took part listing their favourite 10 Liverpool players of all time.

Fairclough's 18th place was higher than John Toshack's 34th and David Johnson's 77th positions, two of the players that prevented Fairclough from gaining more Liverpool appearances.

Fairclough was married to Jan Fairclough who died on 9 April 2011. Jan collapsed suddenly on the morning of 6 April of a brain haemorrhage and died 3 days later. A minute of silence was held for Jan (as well as the 96 Hillsborough victims and Mark Burgan, a soldier from Liverpool) at Anfield before a Liverpool vs. Manchester City match on 11 April 2011. Fairclough and Jan have two children, Tom and Sophie.

Fairclough suffered a minor heart attack on 3 October 2010, at the age of 53, but made a full recovery.

== Honours ==
Liverpool

- Football League First Division: 1975–76, 1976–77, 1979–80
- Football League Cup: 1982–83; runner-up: 1977–78
- FA Charity Shield: 1976, 1977, 1979, 1980
- European Cup: 1976–77, 1977–78
- UEFA Cup: 1975–76
- UEFA Super Cup: 1977

Tranmere Rovers

- Associate Members' Cup: 1989–90
