= Jon Kenworthy =

Welsh footballer

Personal information
- Full name: Jonathan Raymond Kenworthy
- Date of birth: 18 August 1974 (age 52)
- Place of birth: St Asaph, Wales
- Position: Winger

Senior career*
Years	Team	Apps	(Gls)
1993–1996	Tranmere Rovers	26	(2)
1995–1996	→ Chester City (loan)	7	(1)
Total		33	(3)
- * Club domestic league appearances and goals

Jon Kenworthy is a Welsh former footballer who played as a winger in the Football League for Tranmere Rovers.
