= Dave Martindale =

English footballer

Personal information
- Date of birth: 9 April 1964 (age 62)
- Place of birth: Liverpool, England
- Position: Midfielder

Senior career*
Years	Team	Apps	(Gls)
1987–1994	Tranmere Rovers	166	(9)
Total		166	(9)
- * Club domestic league appearances and goals

Dave Martindale (born 9 April 1964) is an English former professional footballer who played as midfielder for Tranmere Rovers.

== Honours ==
Tranmere Rovers

- Football League Third Division play-offs: 1991
- Associate Members' Cup runner-up: 1990–91
