= Steve Cooper (footballer, born 1964) =

English footballer

Personal information
- Full name: Stephen Brian Cooper
- Date of birth: 22 June 1964
- Place of birth: Birmingham, England
- Date of death: 15 February 2004 (aged 39)
- Place of death: Birmingham, England
- Height: 5 ft 11 in (1.80 m)
- Position: Striker

Senior career*
Years	Team	Apps	(Gls)
1982–1984	Birmingham City	0	(0)
1983–1984	→ Halifax Town (loan)	7	(1)
1984	→ NAC Breda (loan)	3	(1)
1984–1985	Newport County	38	(11)
1985–1988	Plymouth Argyle	73	(15)
1988–1990	Barnsley	77	(13)
1990–1993	Tranmere Rovers	32	(3)
1992	→ Peterborough United (loan)	9	(0)
1992–1993	→ Wigan Athletic (loan)	4	(0)
1993–1994	York City	38	(6)
1994–1999	Airdrieonians	133	(42)
1999–2000	Ayr United	0	(0)
Total		414	(92)
- * Club domestic league appearances and goals

Stephen Brian Cooper (22 June 1964 – 15 February 2004) was an English professional footballer who played as a forward. Best known for his time spent with Airdrieonians, his headed goal in the semi-final at Hampden against Hearts ensured that his side made it to the 1995 Scottish Cup final and he played the full 90 minutes against Celtic as the Diamonds lost 1–0 to a Pierre van Hooijdonk goal.

Before joining Airdrie, Cooper played for a number of clubs in England, most notably Tranmere Rovers, where he scored twice in Tranmere's successful playoff campaign in 1991, which resulted in the club's promotion to the First Division, and also scored in the club's 3–2 defeat against Cooper's former club, Birmingham City, in the Associate Members' Cup Final, also in 1991. In 1984, he had a loan spell in the Netherlands with NAC Breda.

For Peterborough United, Cooper came off the bench to score a late diving header, winning the 1992 Third Division play-off semi-final second leg against Huddersfield Town.

He was inducted into the Airdrie United Hall of Fame in 2004 as recognition of his service to the club.

He died in his sleep at his home in Yardley, Birmingham, on 15 February 2004, unknowingly having had a bleed on the brain.

== Honours ==
Tranmere Rovers

- Football League Third Division play-offs: 1991
- Associate Members' Cup runner-up: 1990–91

Airdrieonians

- Scottish Challenge Cup: 1994–95
