= Liam O'Brien (footballer, born 1964) =

Irish footballer

Personal information
- Full name: William Francis O'Brien
- Date of birth: 5 September 1964 (age 62)
- Place of birth: Dublin, Ireland
- Height: 6 ft 1 in (1.85 m)
- Position: Midfielder

Youth career
- Stella Maris

Senior career*
Years	Team	Apps	(Gls)
1982–1983	Bohemians	5	(1)
1983–1986	Shamrock Rovers	70	(21)
1986–1988	Manchester United	31	(2)
1988–1994	Newcastle United	151	(19)
1994–1999	Tranmere Rovers	181	(12)
1999–2000	Cork City	27	(4)
2000–2002	Bohemians	7	(0)
Total		472	(59)

International career
1986	League of Ireland XI	2	(0)
1986–1996	Republic of Ireland	16	(0)
1989	Republic of Ireland U23	1	(0)
- * Club domestic league appearances and goals

William Francis O'Brien (born 5 September 1964) is an Irish former footballer who played for Bohemians, Shamrock Rovers, Manchester United, Newcastle United, Tranmere Rovers and Cork City.

== Club career ==
O'Brien began his career with the schoolboy club Stella Maris. He began his senior career under Billy Young at Bohemians where he was also a youth international representing his country at the 1983 UEFA European Under-18 Championship where Ireland were knocked out despite not losing a game.

In April 1983 he played for the League of Ireland XI U21s against their Italian League counterparts who included Roberto Mancini and Gianluca Vialli in their team.

After only five League appearances, he signed for Shamrock Rovers in September 1983. The midfielder had Rovers blood in him as his grandfather Tom Caulfield was a regular in the first team at Glenmalure Park in the 1920s.

After having won his third League of Ireland title with Shamrock Rovers in 1986, and making six appearances in European competition and 118 total appearances, O'Brien became Ron Atkinson's last signing as manager of Manchester United. He joined the Reds for an initial fee of £50,000.

With the club not recovering sufficiently after losing their first three league games of the season, a League Cup loss to Southampton saw Alex Ferguson take over from Atkinson as manager in November 1986, with O'Brien making his debut a couple of games into Ferguson's tenure, in a 2-0 win over Leicester City at Old Trafford on 20 November 1986.

O'Brien would play nine times that season, including a record-breaking appearance in an away game at Southampton in January 1987 where he was sent-off just 85 seconds, compounded by the fact the game was live on television back home in Ireland. The dismissal, a then English top-flight record, is still the quickest in club history. The majority of his appearances in the 1987–88 season were as a substitute, and, frustrated by lack of first-team opportunities, he joined Newcastle United in a £275,000 move in November 1988, after 36 appearances (31 in the League) & two goals for Manchester United.

His career at St James' Park brought mixed fortunes. O'Brien suffered relegation from the top flight in the 1988–89 season. However, he played a major role as Newcastle won the First Division title in 1993, making 33 appearances and scoring six goals.

O'Brien found himself surplus to requirements as Newcastle rejoined the top flight and subsequently made a £350,000 move to Tranmere Rovers after a successful loan period. He helped Tranmere to the semi-finals of the 1993–94 League Cup, where they faced Aston Villa. After a 4-4 draw on aggregate the game went to a penalty shootout. In sudden death, O'Brien had a chance to score and send his side to Wembley, but Mark Bosnich saved his penalty and the Premier League side eventually won. After Tranmere, he signed for Cork City, where he played in the UEFA Cup before returning to Bohemians in 2000 as player-coach. He enjoyed some great European nights during this season as Bohs knocked out Aberdeen and beat 1.FC Kaiserslautern. He also played a part as Bohs won the League and Cup Double before retiring as a player.

== International career ==
O'Brien played for the Republic of Ireland national under-19 football team that qualified for the 1983 UEFA European Under-18 Championship where despite remaining unbeaten in a group that included eventual winners France they were eliminated. He was also a Republic of Ireland international, winning his first cap while still at Shamrock Rovers. In all he won 16 caps as well as an U23 cap and was part of the UEFA Euro 1988 squad.

== Coaching career ==
After retiring as a player, O'Brien had spells as assistant manager at Bohemians and Shamrock Rovers. He was appointed first team coach of Hibernian in November 2011 by Pat Fenlon. O'Brien left Hibernian after the end of the 2012–13 season. O'Briens last coaching role was at Sligo Rovers who he joined in 2015.

== Honours ==
Shamrock Rovers

- League of Ireland: 1983–84, 1984–85, 1985–86
- FAI Cup: 1985, 1986
- Leinster Senior Cup: 1984–85
- LFA President's Cup: 1984–85, 1986–87
- Dublin City Cup: 1983–84

Newcastle United

- Football League First Division: 1992–93

Individual

- PFAI Young Player of the Year: 1985–86
- SWAI Personality of the Year: 1985–86

== Sources ==
- Paul Doolan; Robert Goggins (1993). The Hoops. Gill & MacMillan. ISBN 0-7171-2121-6.
