= Neil McNab =

Scottish footballer and manager

Personal information
- Full name: Neil McNab
- Date of birth: 4 June 1957 (age 69)
- Place of birth: Greenock, Scotland
- Height: 5 ft 7 in (1.70 m)
- Position: Midfielder

Youth career
- Greenock Morton

Senior career*
Years	Team	Apps	(Gls)
1972–1974	Greenock Morton	14	(0)
1974–1978	Tottenham Hotspur	72	(3)
1978–1980	Bolton Wanderers	35	(4)
1980–1983	Brighton and Hove Albion	103	(4)
1982–1983	→ Leeds United (loan)	5	(0)
1983	→ Portsmouth (loan)	0	(0)
1983–1990	Manchester City	221	(16)
1990–1992	Tranmere Rovers	105	(6)
1992	→ Huddersfield Town (loan)	11	(0)
1992–1993	Ayr United	4	(0)
1993	Darlington	4	(0)
1993	Derry City	13	(0)
1994	Witton Albion	12	(0)
1994	Long Island Rough Riders		
Total		599	(33)

International career
1978	Scotland U21	1	(0)

Managerial career
- 2002–2003: Exeter City
- * Club domestic league appearances and goals

Neil McNab (born 4 June 1957) is a Scottish former footballer who played as a midfielder.

== Playing career ==
McNab began his career in 1972 with Greenock Morton where he made 14 appearances before 1974, becoming the club's youngest ever professional. He was signed by Tottenham Hotspur and became their youngest ever first team player at age 16. He made 72 appearances for Spurs, scoring 3 goals. He played for the Scotland national team at the U-15, U-18 and U-21 levels.

In November 1978 he was transferred to Bolton Wanderers for a fee of £250,000, making 35 appearances and scoring 4 goals, before Brighton and Hove Albion acquired his services for the fee of £220,000 in February 1980. During 1982 he played in loan spells at Leeds United and Portsmouth.

Then in 1983 he signed for £35,000 for Manchester City with whom he stayed until 1990. He was arguably City's player of the eighties, being voted Player of the Year in both the 1986–87 and 1988–89 seasons. A skilful and very combative defensive midfielder, Neil inspired a young team to promotion from the Second Division in 1989. He played 221 league matches for City and scored 16 goals.

He left for Tranmere Rovers in January 1990 for £125,000, the third six-figure move of his career, and played over 100 first-team games for them, including two Associate Members' Cup finals at Wembley; winning one of them in 1990.

He subsequently also enjoyed spells playing for Huddersfield Town, Ayr United, Darlington, Derry City, Witton Albion, and the Long Island Rough Riders in the USA.

Made his Derry debut in October 1993.

== Coaching and management career ==
In the summer of 1994 he rejoined Manchester City as Youth Team Coach but lost his job in the managerial upheaval in 1997. He then coached at Portsmouth in their youth development programme. In October 2002 he was appointed manager of Exeter City, a position he held for just four months.

From 2008 through 2013, he coached several teams at Chiefs Futbol Club soccer association.

== Honours ==
Tottenham Hotspur

- FA Youth Cup: 1973–74

Manchester City

- Full Members' Cup runner-up: 1985–86

Tranmere Rovers

- Associate Members' Cup: 1989–90; runner-up: 1990–91

Individual

- PFA Team of the Year: 1988–89 Second Division, 1990–91 Third Division
- Manchester City Player of the Year: 1986–87, 1988–89
