= Dave Higgins =

English footballer (born 1961)

Personal information
- Full name: David Anthony Higgins
- Date of birth: 19 August 1961 (age 65)
- Place of birth: Liverpool, England
- Position: Defender

Senior career*
Years	Team	Apps	(Gls)
–1983	Eagles		
1983–85	Tranmere Rovers	28	(0)
1985–86	South Liverpool		
1986–87	Caernarfon Town		
1987–97	Tranmere Rovers	319	(12)
1997–98	Barrow		
Total		347	(12)
- * Club domestic league appearances and goals

David Anthony Higgins (born 19 August 1961, Liverpool) is a footballer who played as a defender for Eagles, Tranmere Rovers, South Liverpool, Caernarfon Town and Barrow.

== Honours ==
Tranmere Rovers

- Football League Third Division play-offs: 1991
- Associate Members' Cup runner-up: 1990–91
