= Mark Hughes (footballer, born 1962) =

Welsh footballer

Personal information
- Date of birth: 3 February 1962 (age 64)
- Place of birth: Port Talbot, Wales
- Position: Central defender

Senior career*
| Years | Team | Apps | (Gls) |
| 1979–1984 | Bristol Rovers | 74 | (3) |
| 1982–1983 | → Torquay United (loan) | 9 | (1) |
| 1984–1985 | Swansea City | 12 | (0) |
| 1984–1986 | Bristol City | 22 | (0) |
| 1985–1994 | Tranmere Rovers | 266 | (9) |
| 1994–1996 | Shrewsbury Town | 22 | (0) |
| Total | | 405 | (13) |
- * Club domestic league appearances and goals

Mark Hughes (born 3 February 1962) is a footballer who played as central defender for Bristol Rovers, Torquay United, Swansea City, Bristol City, Tranmere Rovers and Shrewsbury Town. At Tranmere he was part of the side that won the 1989–90 Associate Members' Cup.

== Honours ==
Tranmere Rovers

- Football League Third Division play-offs: 1991
- Associate Members' Cup: 1989–90; runner-up: 1990–91
