= Chris Malkin =

English footballer

Personal information
- Full name: Christopher Gregory Malkin
- Date of birth: 4 June 1967 (age 59)
- Place of birth: Bebington, England
- Height: 6 ft 3 in (1.91 m)
- Position: Centre-forward

Senior career*
Years	Team	Apps	(Gls)
1986–1987	Stork	?	(?)
1987–1995	Tranmere Rovers	232	(60)
1995–1996	Millwall	52	(13)
1996–1999	Blackpool	65	(6)
1999–2001	Telford	51	(10)
2001–2002	Chester City	8	(0)
2002–200?	Oswestry Town	?	(?)
Total		408	(89)
- * Club domestic league appearances and goals

Christopher Gregory Malkin (born 4 June 1967) is an English former professional footballer who played as a centre-forward.

== Career ==
Malkin began his professional career at Tranmere Rovers, whom he joined from Stork on a free transfer in 1987. He spent eight years at Prenton Park, forming a successful partnership with John Aldridge upon his arrival from Real Sociedad in 1991, halfway through Malkin's stay on the Wirral. A couple of months earlier Malkin scored the winning goal at Wembley Stadium to win the Division Three play-off final against Bolton Wanderers. At Tranmere he was also part of the side that won the 1989–90 Associate Members' Cup.

After over 200 league appearances and 60 goals for Rovers, Malkin joined Millwall in 1995 for a £400,000 price tag. In fifteen months at the Den, he scored thirteen goals in a half-century of league appearances for the Lions.

In 1996, Malkin moved back north, joining Gary Megson's Blackpool for £275,000, becoming the Seasiders' record signing (which he remained until 2008). An injury-prone period at Bloomfield Road meant he made only 65 league appearances and scored six goals for the Lancashire club in just under three years.

Blackpool didn't receive any return on their record outlay when, in August 1999, Nigel Worthington let the forward join Telford United on a free transfer.

Malkin joined Chester City as player-physio in 2001, and a year later moved to Oswestry Town, with whom he finished his career.

Malkin now works as a physiotherapist at Spire Murrayfield Hospital in Wirral, helping patients back to fitness. He previously had spells as club physio for Aston Villa and Nottingham Forest.

== Honours ==
Tranmere Rovers

- Football League Third Division play-offs: 1991
- Associate Members' Cup: 1989–90; runner-up: 1990–91
