= Kenny Irons (footballer) =

English footballer

Personal information
- Full name: Kenneth Irons
- Date of birth: 4 November 1970 (age 55)
- Place of birth: Liverpool, England
- Position: Midfielder

Youth career
- Tranmere Rovers

Senior career*
Years	Team	Apps	(Gls)
1989–1999	Tranmere Rovers	351	(54)
1999–2003	Huddersfield Town	149	(11)
2003–2004	Linfield	35	(2)
2004	NEWI Cefn Druids	11	(0)
2004–2006	Caernarfon Town	36	(4)
Total		582	(71)
- * Club domestic league appearances and goals

Kenneth Irons (born 4 November 1970) is an English former professional footballer who made more than 500 appearances in the Football League playing for Tranmere Rovers and Huddersfield Town.

He was signed up as a trainee at Tranmere Rovers in 1989, where he made nearly 400 appearances for them in 10 years, before moving to Steve Bruce's Huddersfield Town side for £500,000 in 1999.

He brought steel to the Terriers' side and is most remembered by Town fans for his 35-yard thunderbolt goal that defeated Gianluca Vialli's Chelsea side 1–0 in the 3rd round of the League Cup at Stamford Bridge.

In 2003, he left Town to join Irish Football League side Linfield, where he helped them gain the title during that season. The following season, he had a short spell at League of Wales side NEWI Cefn Druids, before moving to Caernarfon Town where he stayed until the arrival of Steve O'Shaughnessy as manager in September 2006.

He played football in Queensland, Australia. Irons stint for the Mareeba Bulls was mildly successful, finishing second the FNQ league. He now coaches at Tranmere Rovers' centre of excellence.

In 2008, Kenny signed for Liverpool Veterans Side Sacre Coeur, who compete in the I Zingari Combination League. However, following the 4–1 defeat on 9 April at the hands of Bootle side Jawbone FC, Irons finally retired.

At the age of 46, Irons helped England win the 2016 Seniors World Cup, for retired professionals, in Thailand.

== Honours ==
Tranmere Rovers

- Football League Third Division play-offs: 1991
- Associate Members' Cup runner-up: 1990–91
