= Ged Brannan =

English footballer

Personal information
- Full name: Gerard Daniel Brannan
- Date of birth: 15 January 1972 (age 54)
- Place of birth: Liverpool, England
- Position: Midfielder

Senior career*
Years	Team	Apps	(Gls)
1990–1997	Tranmere Rovers	238	(20)
1997–1998	Manchester City	43	(4)
1998	→ Norwich City (loan)	11	(1)
1998–2001	Motherwell	81	(16)
2001–2003	Wigan Athletic	52	(0)
2003	→ Dunfermline Athletic (loan)	8	(0)
2003	→ Rochdale (loan)	11	(1)
2003–2005	Accrington Stanley	49	(7)
2005	Radcliffe Borough	11	(0)
2005–2007	Morecambe	55	(1)
2007–2008	Vauxhall Motors	11	(1)
2013–2016	Burscough	17	(1)
Total		575	(52)

Managerial career
- 2023–2024: Morecambe
- * Club domestic league appearances and goals

Gerard Daniel Brannan (born 15 January 1972) is an English football manager and former player. He is the assistant manager of Accrington Stanley.

As a player he was a midfielder who notably played in the Football League for Tranmere Rovers, Manchester City and Wigan Athletic, as well as in the Scottish Premier League for Motherwell. He also played professionally for Norwich City, Dunfermline Athletic and Rochdale. He also played non-league football for Accrington Stanley, Radcliffe Borough, Morecambe, Vauxhall Motors and Burscough.

== Club career ==
Brannan had a well-travelled career, beginning at Tranmere Rovers, before a £750,000 transfer to Manchester City in March 1997.

Mostly used as a squad player at Manchester City, he was loaned to Norwich City between August and October 1998, scoring once against Sheffield United, and was then sold to Motherwell for £375,000 in October 1998, thus terminating his spell at Norwich.

Brannan moved onto Wigan in February 2001, where he remained until November 2003, scoring once against Blackpool in the League Cup. Whilst at Wigan he had short loan spells at Dunfermline and Rochdale.

A free transfer to Accrington Stanley in November 2003 was next on the agenda, where he spent two seasons.

After leaving Stanley, Ged spent a short period playing for Radcliffe Borough before signing for Morecambe in November 2005, making his debut against Cambridge United. Shortly before the match, Morecambe manager Jim Harvey suffered a heart attack. Morecambe lost the first match 1–0.

Signed by Harvey as a midfielder, Brannan was soon dropped by caretaker manager Sammy McIlroy, but eventually made the right back position his own, after filling in for an injury and putting in several impressive performances. He scored his first and what turned out to be only goal for Morecambe in a 2–2 draw with Exeter City.

Brannan saw himself out of the team again at the start of the 2006–07 season, as Adam Yates was brought to Morecambe to play at right-back. Brannan filled in central defence during the absence of club captain Jim Bentley through injury and made several appearances in midfield.

In December 2006, it was announced Brannan would be moving to Southport to take the assistant manager position, as club manager Paul Cook was a personal friend. However, Cook was sacked from Southport before the move could take place in the January transfer window, and subsequently Brannan decided to stay with Morecambe. His Morecambe squad number for the 2006–07 season was 12.

Morecambe's triumph presented Brannan with the accolade of becoming the first player to win promotion at both the old and new Wembley.

On 2 November 2007 Brannan came out of retirement and signed for Vauxhall Motors and made his debut the next day at Rivacre Park in their home game against Worcester City. He finished his career with Burscough.

== International career ==
Brannan received a call up by the Cayman Islands national team due to a loophole in the regulations, on 29 February 2000 along with several other league players including Barry Hayles and Wayne Collins, at the time both at Fulham. Brannan accepted the call up, however FIFA blocked the call-up.

== Coaching career ==
Brannan was the under-23s manager at Accrington Stanley.

In September 2023, Brannan joined the coaching staff at Morecambe. After the departure of manager Derek Adams in November, Brannan was appointed caretaker manager, along with John McMahon. Brannan was subsequently appointed as first team manager on 27 November 2023, signing an 18-month contract. With financial issues at the club mounting, Brannan departed the club at the end of the 2023–24 season, returning to Accrington Stanley as assistant manager.

== Managerial statistics ==
As of 27 April 2024

Team	From	To	Record				
Team	From	To	G	W	D	L	Win %
Morecambe	20 November 2023	30 April 2024	32	10	7	15	31.25
Total			32	10	7	15	31.25

- Brannan was caretaker until 27 November 2023 when he was appointed permanently.

== Honours ==
Tranmere Rovers

- Football League Third Division play-offs: 1991
- Associate Members' Cup runner-up: 1990–91
