= Eric Nixon =

English footballer (born 1962)

Personal information
- Full name: Eric Walter Nixon
- Date of birth: 4 October 1962 (age 64)
- Place of birth: Manchester, England
- Height: 6 ft 2 in (1.88 m)
- Position: Goalkeeper

Senior career*
| Years | Team | Apps | (Gls) |
| 1982–1983 | Curzon Ashton | ?? | (?) |
| 1983–1988 | Manchester City | 58 | (0) |
| 1986 | → Wolverhampton Wanderers (loan) | 16 | (0) |
| 1986 | → Bradford City (loan) | 3 | (0) |
| 1986 | → Southampton (loan) | 4 | (0) |
| 1987 | → Carlisle United (loan) | 16 | (0) |
| 1988 | → Tranmere Rovers (loan) | 8 | (0) |
| 1988–1997 | Tranmere Rovers | 333 | (0) |
| 1996 | → Reading (loan) | 0 | (0) |
| 1996 | → Blackpool (loan) | 20 | (0) |
| 1996 | → Bradford City (loan) | 12 | (0) |
| 1997–1999 | Stockport County | 42 | (0) |
| 1998 | → Wigan Athletic (loan) | 1 | (0) |
| 1999 | Wigan Athletic | 2 | (0) |
| 1999–2003 | Tranmere Rovers | 5 | (0) |
| 2001 | → Kidderminster Harriers (loan) | 2 | (0) |
| 2003–2004 | Sheffield Wednesday | 1 | (0) |
| Total | | 522 | (0) |
- * Club domestic league appearances and goals

Eric Walter Nixon (born 4 October 1962) is an English former professional footballer who played as goalkeeper. His career spanned 22 years, thirteen of which were spent at Tranmere Rovers. He played for thirteen different clubs and made over 500 league appearances before his retirement in 2004.

== Career ==
=== Playing career ===
==== Early career, Manchester City and loans ====
Born in Manchester, Nixon began his career in August 1982 at Non-League club Curzon Ashton from Ashton-under-Lyne in Greater Manchester. Nixon then walked into Manchester City's stadium, Maine Road and asked for a trial. On 10 December 1983, he signed for Manchester City for a transfer fee of £1,000. He made 84 appearances in five years at the club, and was sent out on loan five times.

And it was with four of those loan spells in the 1986–87 season that he achieved the rare distinction of playing for clubs in all four divisions of the Football League in a single season- in fact, in only nine weeks. In August 1986 he went on loan to Wolverhampton Wanderers, who were then in the Fourth Division, making sixteen league appearances. This was followed by a short spell on loan at Bradford City, who were then in the Second Division, in November 1986. In December 1986 he briefly replaced an injured Peter Shilton at Southampton, who were then in the First Division. The following month he went out on loan again, this time to Carlisle United, who were then in the Third Division, where he made sixteen league appearances. He finished the 1986–87 season back at Manchester City, playing five more games in the First Division.

Nixon's final loan move while at Manchester City came in March 1988, when he was sent to Tranmere Rovers, for whom he made eight league appearances.

==== Tranmere Rovers ====
Nixon signed for Tranmere Rovers permanently for a fee of £60,000 on 26 July 1988. In nine years at Prenton Park Nixon made 432 appearances, including 333 league appearances, and was with the club during their rise from the Fourth Division to the First Division play-offs in 1992–93. In the 1988–89 season he kept 25 clean sheets, which still stands as a club record for the most clean sheets in a season.

He was also a part of the Tranmere team that won the Associate Members' Cup in 1989–90, beating Bristol Rovers 2–1 in the final at Wembley with goals by forwards Ian Muir and Jim Steel. In 1996, towards the end of his time at Tranmere, Nixon found himself again being sent out on loan three times. In January, he joined Reading; the following month he was loaned to Blackpool, for whom he made 20 league appearances; and in September he spent a second loan spell at Bradford City, making twelve league appearances.

==== Stockport County, Wigan Athletic and back to Tranmere Rovers ====
On 27 August 1997, Nixon was signed by Stockport County for £100,000. In 19 months at Edgeley Park, he made 42 league appearances, and he was also sent on loan again, this time to Wigan Athletic in August 1998, before signing for them permanently in March 1999 on a free transfer. However, his time at Wigan was short-lived, and on 4 July he was back at Tranmere Rovers for a third time, on another free transfer, where he stayed for a further four years, becoming a part-time goalkeeping coach. After focussing on coaching rather than playing, Nixon spent one short loan spell at Kidderminster Harriers in October 2001, for whom he kept three clean sheets in three games. On his return, he signed non-contract terms with Tranmere. On 8 August 2002, he again signed as a non-contract player with the club to provide cover for Keith Welch, who Tranmere had just signed. The 2002–03 season was his testimonial season and his testimonial match was played at Prenton Park on 6 August against the club he supported as a youngster, and for whom he first played professionally – Manchester City.

When he played in goal against Crewe Alexandra on 21 September 2002, Nixon, at 39 years and 352 days old, became the oldest player to ever play for the club: his record was subsequently broken by Ian Goodison.

Nixon's final club was Sheffield Wednesday, for whom he signed on a free transfer on 1 July 2003, and where he was used as a goalkeeping coach, making one league appearance – on 27 September 2003 against Grimsby Town. His spell with the club was spent coaching three days a week, and spending two days back at Tranmere Rovers coaching.

=== Coaching ===
While he was still playing, Nixon had started working towards gaining his goalkeeping coach licence, and in August 2004 he became a full-time goalkeeping coach with Tranmere Rovers.

Nixon now holds both a UEFA goalkeeping coaching A licence and a UEFA football coaching A licence. On 10 February 2006, Nixon gave up his coaching responsibilities with Tranmere Rovers because of knee problems and also to attend a personal-fitness coaching course before opening a health and fitness studio in Prenton, before moving to Dubai, where he worked as a personal fitness trainer.

On 5 February 2007, Nixon was honoured for his outstanding service to Tranmere Rovers as the winner of the Dave Russell Award at the annual Sports Personality Awards in Liverpool.

Nixon has also written a regular column for the Liverpool Echo newspaper.

In October 2008, Nixon was appointed goalkeeping coach at Conference North club Fleetwood Town by manager Micky Mellon. The two were teammates at Tranmere Rovers and during Nixon's spell on loan at Blackpool in 1996. He left the club in May 2011 by mutual consent.

In 2012, Nixon released his autobiography Big Hands, Big Heart. He continues to play charity games for his former clubs, coach youngsters at a local leisure centre and provide match commentary and analysis for the media. In Summer 2012 he gave an exclusive interview to SKY TV's Holiday and Cruise Channel talking about his life and career. In February 2013 he opened a new sports centre for youngsters on the Wirral.

On 17 May 2013, Nixon was named new goalkeeping coach with Chesterfield F.C. joining ex-teammate Paul Cook who now manages the Spireites. Both previously played together at Tranmere and Stockport in the late nineties. In summer 2017, Nixon was reunited with Mellon, becoming the Tranmere Rovers goalkeeping coach.

== Honours ==
Manchester City

- Full Members' Cup runner-up: 1985–86

Tranmere Rovers

- Football League Third Division play-offs: 1991
- Associate Members' Cup: 1989–90; runner-up: 1990–91

Individual

- PFA Team of the Year: 1988–89 Fourth Division, 1989–90 Third Division, 1990–91 Third Division
