= John Morrissey (footballer) =

English footballer

Personal information
- Date of birth: 8 March 1965 (age 61)
- Place of birth: Liverpool, England
- Position: Winger

Youth career
- Everton

Senior career*
Years	Team	Apps	(Gls)
1984–1985	Everton	1	(0)
1985	Wolverhampton Wanderers	10	(1)
1985–1999	Tranmere Rovers	470	(50)
Total		481	(51)

International career
1983	England Youth	2	(0)
- * Club domestic league appearances and goals

John Morrissey Jr. (born 8 March 1965) is an English former professional footballer who played as a winger. Active between 1984 and 1999, Morrissey made nearly 500 appearances in the Football League.

== Career ==
Born in Liverpool, Morrissey played in the Football League for Everton, Wolverhampton Wanderers, and Tranmere Rovers.

== Personal life ==
His father Johnny was also a professional footballer.

== Honours ==
Tranmere Rovers

- Football League Third Division play-offs: 1991
- Associate Members' Cup runner-up: 1990–91
