= Tony Thomas (footballer) =

English footballer

Personal information
- Full name: Anthony Thomas
- Date of birth: 12 July 1971 (age 55)
- Place of birth: Liverpool, England
- Position: Defender

Youth career
- 1985–1986: Tranmere Rovers

Senior career*
Years	Team	Apps	(Gls)
1986–1997	Tranmere Rovers	257	(12)
1997–1998	Everton	8	(0)
1998–2001	Motherwell	16	(0)
Total		281	(12)
- * Club domestic league appearances and goals

Anthony Thomas (born 12 July 1971) is an English former professional footballer who played as a defender in the Football League for Tranmere Rovers, where he spent the majority of his career, in the Premier League for Everton and in the Scottish Premier League for Motherwell.

== Career ==
Thomas was born in Liverpool. He began his career as a junior with Tranmere Rovers reserves, and quickly advanced through the ranks. He made his debut as a 17-year-old in the 1987–88 season and made more than 300 appearances in the next ten years. At Tranmere he was part of the side that won the 1989–90 Football League Trophy. After completing a £400,000 move to Everton before the 1997–98 season, injury disrupted his progress and he failed to hold down a first-team place.

He was sold to Motherwell at the beginning of the next season for £150,000, and scored his first and only goal for the club in a 3–1 Scottish Cup win over Hearts in January 1999. He retired from professional football due to injury in 2001.

== Honours ==
Tranmere Rovers

- Football League Third Division play-offs: 1991
- Associate Members' Cup: 1989–90; runner-up: 1990–91
