= Ian Muir (English footballer) =

English footballer

Personal information
- Full name: Ian James Muir
- Date of birth: 5 May 1963 (age 63)
- Place of birth: Coventry, England
- Height: 5 ft 8 in (1.73 m)
- Position: Striker

Youth career
- 1979–1980: Queens Park Rangers

Senior career*
| Years | Team | Apps | (Gls) |
| 1980–1983 | Queens Park Rangers | 2 | (2) |
| 1982 | → Burnley (loan) | 2 | (1) |
| 1983–1984 | Birmingham City | 1 | (0) |
| 1984–1985 | Brighton & Hove Albion | 4 | (0) |
| 1985 | → Swindon Town (loan) | 2 | (0) |
| 1985–1995 | Tranmere Rovers | 314 | (142) |
| 1995 | Birmingham City | 1 | (0) |
| 1995 | Darlington | 4 | (1) |
| 1996–1997 | Sing Tao | ? | (9) |
| 1997–1998 | Happy Valley | ? | (1) |
| 1998–2000 | Nuneaton Borough | | |
| 2000 | Stratford Town | | |

International career
| 1978 | England Schoolboys | 4 | (4) |
| 1981 | England U20 | 1 | (0) |
- * Club domestic league appearances and goals

Ian James Muir (born 5 May 1963) is an English former professional football striker who scored 146 goals from 330 appearances in the Football League playing for Queens Park Rangers, Burnley, Birmingham City, Brighton & Hove Albion, Swindon Town, Tranmere Rovers and Darlington. He also played in the Hong Kong First Division League for Sing Tao and Happy Valley, before returning to non-league football in England with Nuneaton Borough and Stratford Town. He is Tranmere's all-time record goalscorer, with 180 goals in all competitions.

== Tranmere Rovers ==
Muir was signed to Tranmere Rovers by player-manager Frank Worthington who was his striking partner in his first season at the club. He spent his early career at Rovers struggling, as the club languished in the basement of the league and Muir was part of the side that beat Exeter City 1–0 to save Rovers from automatic relegation from Division Four in 1987. He set up the crucial goal, headed in by Gary Williams in the 77th minute of the last game of that season. Muir prospered when new manager John King signed a big target-man, Jim Steel, as his strike partner in late 1987. Within four years, Rovers had been promoted twice and appeared at Wembley five times, with Muir scoring in the FA's centenary celebrations in 1988 and in Tranmere's Associate Members Cup final victory over Bristol Rovers in 1990. Injury prevented Muir partaking in the final strait of Rovers' promotion run in 1991 when they reached the second tier of English football for only the second time in their history. That summer, the signing of John Aldridge led to the marginalisation of Muir, who remained a regular goalscorer when called upon for the remainder of his Tranmere career.

== Honours ==
Tranmere Rovers

- Associate Members' Cup: 1989–90

Individual

- PFA Team of the Year: 1988–89 Fourth Division, 1989–90 Third Division
