= Steve Mungall =

Scottish footballer and manager

Personal information
- Full name: Steven Henry Mungall
- Date of birth: 22 May 1958 (age 68)
- Place of birth: Bellshill, Scotland
- Height: 5 ft 8 in (1.73 m)
- Position: Defender

Senior career*
Years	Team	Apps	(Gls)
–1976	Chapelhall B.C.		
1976–1979	Motherwell	20	(0)
1979–1996	Tranmere Rovers	512	(13)
Total		532	(13)

Managerial career
- 2001: Chester City
- * Club domestic league appearances and goals

Steven Henry Mungall (born 22 May 1958) is a Scottish former football player and manager.

After joining Tranmere Rovers from Motherwell in 1979, Mungall went on to make more than 500 Football League appearances for Rovers in a 17-year period. This spell saw Rovers rise up the league and make several appearances at Wembley, including winning the Football League Trophy in 1990. He remained with the club on the coaching staff before leaving in October 2000 to pursue business interests.

Mungall was quickly back in football, when he was appointed manager of Chester City in October 2001. The Blues were struggling in the Football Conference when Mungall took over, initially as caretaker-manager. His first match ended in a 2–0 home win over Hereford United and he was soon handed the job on a permanent basis. But a dreadful run of form saw Chester dragged into serious relegation trouble and Mungall was sacked after a defeat to Northwich Victoria on 26 December 2001.

Mungall was later on the coaching staff at Droylsden, a role he left in December 2007.

On 13 February 2008, Mungall returned to Chester City as assistant manager to Bobby Williamson but he left along with Williamson early the following month.

== Honours ==
Tranmere Rovers

- Associate Members' Cup: 1989–90
