= 1989–90 Associate Members' Cup =

1989–90 Associate Members Cup
Leyland DAF Cup

Tournament details
- Country: England; Wales

The 1989–90 Associate Members' Cup, known as the 1989–90 Leyland DAF Cup, was the ninth staging of a secondary football league tournament, and the seventh staging of the Associate Members' Cup, a knock-out competition for English football clubs in the Third Division and the Fourth Division. The winners were Tranmere Rovers and the runners-up were Bristol Rovers.

The competition began on 7 November 1989 and ended with the final on 20 May 1990 at Wembley Stadium.

In the first round, there were two sections split into eight groups: North and South. In the following rounds each section gradually eliminates teams in knock-out fashion until each has a winning finalist. At this point, the two winning finalists faced each other in the combined final for the honour of the trophy.

== Preliminary round ==
=== Northern Section ===
Group 1
Team	Pld	W	D	L	GF	GA	GD	Pts
Halifax Town	2	1	0	1	4	2	+2	3
Lincoln City	2	1	0	1	3	3	0	3
Chesterfield	2	1	0	1	2	4	−2	3

Date	Team 1	Score	Team 2
7 Nov	Halifax Town	3–0	Lincoln City
29 Nov	Lincoln City	3–0	Chesterfield
12 Dec	Chesterfield	2–1	Halifax Town

Group 2
Team	Pld	W	D	L	GF	GA	GD	Pts
Doncaster Rovers	2	1	1	0	3	2	+1	4
Huddersfield Town	2	0	2	0	5	5	0	2
Grimsby Town	2	0	1	1	3	4	−1	1

Date	Team 1	Score	Team 2
7 Nov	Huddersfield Town	2–2	Doncaster Rovers
28 Nov	Doncaster Rovers	1–0	Grimsby Town
12 Dec	Grimsby Town	3–3	Huddersfield Town

Group 3
Team	Pld	W	D	L	GF	GA	GD	Pts
Blackpool	2	1	0	1	4	1	+3	3
Bury	2	1	0	1	4	5	−1	3
Wrexham	2	1	0	1	2	4	−2	3

Date	Team 1	Score	Team 2
7 Nov	Wrexham	1–0	Blackpool
28 Nov	Blackpool	4–0	Bury
9 Dec	Bury	4–1	Wrexham

Group 4
Team	Pld	W	D	L	GF	GA	GD	Pts
Tranmere Rovers	2	2	0	0	2	0	+2	6
Chester City	2	0	1	1	0	1	−1	1
Rochdale	2	0	1	1	0	1	−1	1

Date	Team 1	Score	Team 2
7 Nov	Tranmere Rovers	1–0	Chester City
28 Nov	Chester City	0–0	Rochdale
12 Dec	Rochdale	0–1	Tranmere Rovers
20 Dec	Rochdale	1–2	Chester City (play-off)

Group 5
Team	Pld	W	D	L	GF	GA	GD	Pts
Preston North End	2	2	0	0	7	2	+5	6
Stockport County	2	1	0	1	4	4	0	3
Burnley	2	0	0	2	0	5	−5	0

Date	Team 1	Score	Team 2
7 Nov	Preston North End	3–0	Burnley
28 Nov	Burnley	0–2	Stockport County
13 Dec	Stockport County	2–4	Preston North End

Group 6
Team	Pld	W	D	L	GF	GA	GD	Pts
Carlisle United	2	1	1	0	2	1	+1	4
Scunthorpe United	2	1	1	0	2	1	+1	4
Scarborough	2	0	0	2	0	2	−2	0

Date	Team 1	Score	Team 2
7 Nov	Scunthorpe United	1–0	Scarborough
29 Nov	Scarborough	0–1	Carlisle United
22 Dec	Carlisle United	1–1	Scunthorpe United

Group 7
Team	Pld	W	D	L	GF	GA	GD	Pts
Rotherham United	2	2	0	0	7	2	+5	6
York City	2	1	0	1	8	4	+4	3
Hartlepool United	2	0	0	2	2	11	−9	0

Date	Team 1	Score	Team 2
7 Nov	York City	7–1	Hartlepool United
28 Nov	Hartlepool United	1–4	Rotherham United
12 Dec	Rotherham United	3–1	York City

Group 8
Team	Pld	W	D	L	GF	GA	GD	Pts
Bolton Wanderers	2	1	0	1	2	1	+1	3
Wigan Athletic	2	1	0	1	1	1	0	3
Crewe Alexandra	2	1	0	1	1	2	−1	3

Date	Team 1	Score	Team 2
28 Nov	Bolton Wanderers	2–0	Crewe Alexandra
5 Dec	Wigan Athletic	1–0	Bolton Wanderers
19 Dec	Crewe Alexandra	1–0	Wigan Athletic

=== Southern Section ===
Group 1
Team	Pld	W	D	L	GF	GA	GD	Pts
Shrewsbury Town	2	2	0	0	5	0	+5	6
Walsall	2	1	0	1	5	4	+1	3
Cardiff City	2	0	0	2	3	9	−6	0

Date	Team 1	Score	Team 2
7 Nov	Cardiff City	3–5	Walsall
28 Nov	Walsall	0–1	Shrewsbury Town
19 Dec	Shrewsbury Town	4–0	Cardiff City

Group 2
Team	Pld	W	D	L	GF	GA	GD	Pts
Bristol Rovers	2	1	0	1	3	1	+2	3
Exeter City	2	1	0	1	2	3	−1	3
Torquay United	2	1	0	1	1	2	−1	3

Date	Team 1	Score	Team 2
7 Nov	Torquay United	1–0	Bristol Rovers
15 Jan	Exeter City	2–0	Torquay United
17 Jan	Bristol Rovers	3–0	Exeter City

Group 3
Team	Pld	W	D	L	GF	GA	GD	Pts
Notts County	2	1	1	0	3	2	+1	4
Peterborough United	2	1	1	0	3	2	+1	4
Fulham	2	0	0	2	0	2	−2	0

Date	Team 1	Score	Team 2
8 Nov	Peterborough United	1–0	Fulham
28 Nov	Fulham	0–1	Notts County
12 Dec	Notts County	2–2	Peterborough United

Group 4
Team	Pld	W	D	L	GF	GA	GD	Pts
Aldershot	2	1	0	1	5	3	+2	3
Hereford United	2	1	0	1	3	3	0	3
Birmingham City	2	1	0	1	1	3	−2	3

Date	Team 1	Score	Team 2
8 Nov	Hereford United	3–2	Aldershot
28 Nov	Aldershot	3–0	Birmingham City
12 Dec	Birmingham City	1–0	Hereford United

Group 5
Team	Pld	W	D	L	GF	GA	GD	Pts
Southend United	2	1	1	0	4	3	+1	4
Gillingham	2	1	0	1	2	1	+1	3
Cambridge United	2	0	1	1	3	5	−2	1

Date	Team 1	Score	Team 2
7 Nov	Southend United	1–0	Gillingham
28 Nov	Gillingham	2–0	Cambridge United
12 Dec	Cambridge United	3–3	Southend United

Group 6
Team	Pld	W	D	L	GF	GA	GD	Pts
Bristol City	2	1	1	0	3	2	+1	4
Reading	2	1	1	0	3	2	+1	4
Swansea City	2	0	0	2	2	4	−2	0

Date	Team 1	Score	Team 2
5 Nov	Bristol City	2–1	Swansea City
15 Jan	Reading	1–1	Bristol City
17 Jan	Swansea City	1–2	Reading

Group 7
Team	Pld	W	D	L	GF	GA	GD	Pts
Maidstone United	2	2	0	0	6	3	+3	6
Northampton Town	2	1	0	1	5	4	+1	3
Colchester United	2	0	0	2	1	5	−4	0

Date	Team 1	Score	Team 2
7 Nov	Colchester United	0–3	Northampton Town
28 Nov	Northampton Town	2–4	Maidstone United
10 Jan	Maidstone United	2–1	Colchester United

Group 8
Team	Pld	W	D	L	GF	GA	GD	Pts
Brentford	2	1	0	1	4	2	+2	3
Leyton Orient	2	1	0	1	2	3	−1	3
Mansfield Town	2	1	0	1	2	3	−1	3

Date	Team 1	Score	Team 2
7 Nov	Brentford	3–0	Leyton Orient
28 Nov	Leyton Orient	2–0	Mansfield Town
9 Dec	Mansfield Town	2–1	Brentford
9 Jan	Mansfield Town	2–1	Leyton Orient (play-off)

== First round ==
=== Northern Section ===
Date	Home team	Score	Away team
9 January	Bolton Wanderers	2–1	Lincoln City
9 January	Carlisle United	1 – 2	Stockport County
9 January	Doncaster Rovers	2–0	Bury
9 January	Halifax Town	1–1	York City
Halifax Town won 7–6 on penalties
9 January	Preston North End	1–2	Wigan Athletic
9 January	Rotherham United	3–0	Huddersfield Town
9 January	Tranmere Rovers	2–1	Scunthorpe United
16 January	Blackpool	0–1	Chester City

=== Southern Section ===
Date	Home team	Score	Away team
9 January	Aldershot	1–4	Walsall
10 January	Peterborough United	0–1	Hereford United
17 January	Maidstone United	2–1	Mansfield Town
17 January	Southend United	2–1	Northampton Town
23 January	Brentford	2–1	Reading
23 January	Bristol City	0–1	Notts County
23 January	Shrewsbury Town	0–1	Exeter City
24 January	Bristol Rovers	1–0	Gillingham

== Quarter-finals ==
=== Northern Section ===
Date	Home team	Score	Away team
30 January	Halifax Town	3 – 1	Stockport County
30 January	Wigan Athletic	1 – 2	Doncaster Rovers
31 January	Bolton Wanderers	1–0	Rotherham United
6 February	Tranmere Rovers	3–0	Chester City

=== Southern Section ===
Date	Home team	Score	Away team
30 January	Walsall	4–1	Southend United
6 February	Brentford	2–2	Bristol Rovers
Bristol Rovers won 4–3 on penalties
21 February	Hereford United	1–1	Notts County
Notts County won 4–3 on penalties
21 February	Maidstone United	2–0	Exeter City

== Area semi-finals ==
=== Northern Section ===
Date	Home team	Score	Away team
20 February	Doncaster Rovers	3–0	Halifax Town
20 February	Tranmere Rovers	2–1	Bolton Wanderers

=== Southern Section ===
Date	Home team	Score	Away team
14 March	Bristol Rovers	0–0	Walsall
Bristol Rovers won 3–2 on penalties
14 March	Maidstone United	0 – 1	Notts County

== Area finals ==
=== Northern Area final ===
12 March 1990

Tranmere Rovers	2–0	Doncaster Rovers
	Report

Prenton Park, Birkenhead
Attendance: 10,004
3 April 1990

Doncaster Rovers	(1) 1 – 1 (3)	Tranmere Rovers
	Report

Belle Vue, Doncaster
Attendance: 6,670

=== Southern Area final ===
28 March 1990

Bristol Rovers	1–0	Notts County
	Report

Memorial Stadium, Bristol
Attendance: 6,480
2 April 1990

Notts County	(0) 0 – 0 (1)	Bristol Rovers
	Report

Meadow Lane, Nottingham
Attendance: 10,857

== Final ==
20 May 1990

Tranmere Rovers	2–1	Bristol Rovers
Muir 9'; Steel 71'		White 55'

Wembley Stadium, London
Attendance: 48,402
Referee: V.Callow (Solihull)

== Notes ==
General

- statto.com

Specific
