= 1990–91 Associate Members' Cup =

1990–91 Associate Members Cup
Leyland DAF Cup

Tournament details
- Country: England; Wales

The 1990–91 Associate Members' Cup, known as the 1990–91 Leyland DAF Cup, was the tenth staging of a secondary football league tournament, and the eighth staging of the Associate Members' Cup, a knock-out competition for English football clubs in the Third Division and the Fourth Division. The winners were Birmingham City and the runners-up were Tranmere Rovers.

The competition began on 5 November 1990 and ended with the final on 26 May 1991 at Wembley Stadium.

In the first round, there were two sections split into eight groups: North and South. In the following rounds each section gradually eliminates teams in knock-out fashion until each has a winning finalist. At this point, the two winning finalists faced each other in the combined final for the honour of the trophy.

== Preliminary round ==
=== Northern Section ===
Group 1
Team	Pld	W	D	L	GF	GA	GD	Pts
Doncaster Rovers	2	1	1	0	2	1	+1	4
Scunthorpe United	2	1	0	1	3	2	+1	3
Chesterfield	2	0	1	1	2	4	−2	1

Date	Team 1	Score	Team 2
6 Nov	Chesterfield	1-1	Doncaster Rovers
27 Nov	Doncaster Rovers	1–0	Scunthorpe United
18 Dec	Scunthorpe United	3–1	Chesterfield

Group 2
Team	Pld	W	D	L	GF	GA	GD	Pts
Wigan Athletic	2	1	0	1	5	2	+3	3
Bury	2	1	0	1	2	3	−1	3
Chester City	2	1	0	1	2	4	−2	3

Date	Team 1	Score	Team 2
6 Nov	Wigan Athletic	4–0	Chester City
27 Nov	Chester City	2–0	Bury
11 Dec	Bury	2–1	Wigan Athletic

Group 3
Team	Pld	W	D	L	GF	GA	GD	Pts
Bradford City	2	1	1	0	5	1	+4	4
Hartlepool United	2	1	0	1	4	5	−1	3
Huddersfield Town	2	0	1	1	2	5	−3	1

Date	Team 1	Score	Team 2
7 Nov	Bradford City	1–1	Huddersfield Town
28 Nov	Huddersfield Town	1–4	Hartlepool United
18 Dec	Hartlepool United	0–4	Bradford City

Group 4
Team	Pld	W	D	L	GF	GA	GD	Pts
Preston North End	2	1	1	0	4	2	+2	4
Rochdale	2	1	0	1	2	3	−1	3
Carlisle United	2	0	1	1	1	2	−1	1

Date	Team 1	Score	Team 2
6 Nov	Carlisle United	1–1	Preston North End
27 Nov	Preston North End	3-1	Rochdale
18 Dec	Rochdale	1-0	Carlisle United

Group 5
Team	Pld	W	D	L	GF	GA	GD	Pts
York City	2	2	0	0	6	3	+3	6
Darlington	2	1	0	1	5	4	+1	3
Grimsby Town	2	0	0	2	2	6	−4	0

Date	Team 1	Score	Team 2
6 Nov	Grimsby Town	1-3	York City
27 Nov	York City	3–2	Darlington
11 Dec	Darlington	3-1	Grimsby Town

Group 6
Team	Pld	W	D	L	GF	GA	GD	Pts
Halifax Town	2	1	1	0	3	2	+1	4
Rotherham United	2	0	2	0	2	2	0	2
Scarborough	2	0	1	1	2	3	−1	1

Date	Team 1	Score	Team 2
5 Nov	Halifax Town	1–1	Rotherham United
27 Nov	Rotherham United	1–1	Scarborough
9 Jan	Scarborough	1–2	Halifax Town

Group 7
Team	Pld	W	D	L	GF	GA	GD	Pts
Tranmere Rovers	2	1	0	1	4	1	+3	3
Blackpool	2	1	0	1	3	4	−1	3
Bolton Wanderers	2	1	0	1	1	3	−2	3

Date	Team 1	Score	Team 2
6 Nov	Bolton Wanderers	1–0	Tranmere Rovers
27 Nov	Tranmere Rovers	4–0	Blackpool
18 Dec	Blackpool	3–0	Bolton Wanderers

Group 8
Team	Pld	W	D	L	GF	GA	GD	Pts
Burnley	2	1	1	0	3	2	+1	4
Stockport County	2	0	2	0	2	2	0	2
Crewe Alexandra	2	0	1	1	2	3	−1	1

Date	Team 1	Score	Team 2
6 Nov	Burnley	2–1	Crewe Alexandra
27 Nov	Crewe Alexandra	1–1	Stockport County
8 Jan	Stockport County	1–1	Burnley

=== Southern Section ===
Group 1
Team	Pld	W	D	L	GF	GA	GD	Pts
Birmingham City	2	2	0	0	3	0	+3	6
Walsall	2	0	1	1	1	2	−1	1
Lincoln City	2	0	1	1	1	3	−2	1

Date	Team 1	Score	Team 2
6 Nov	Walsall	0–1	Birmingham City
27 Nov	Birmingham City	2–0	Lincoln City
12 Dec	Lincoln City	1–1	Walsall

Group 2
Team	Pld	W	D	L	GF	GA	GD	Pts
Cambridge United	2	2	0	0	3	0	+3	6
Wrexham	2	0	1	1	3	4	−1	1
Peterborough United	2	0	1	1	3	5	−2	1

Date	Team 1	Score	Team 2
6 Nov	Peterborough United	0–2	Cambridge United
27 Nov	Wrexham	3–3	Peterborough United
18 Dec	Cambridge United	1–0	Wrexham

Group 3
Team	Pld	W	D	L	GF	GA	GD	Pts
Shrewsbury Town	2	0	2	0	2	2	0	2
Swansea City	2	0	2	0	2	2	0	2
Torquay United	2	0	2	0	2	2	0	2

Date	Team 1	Score	Team 2
6 Nov	Torquay United	1–1	Swansea City
27 Nov	Swansea City	1–1	Shrewsbury Town
18 Dec	Shrewsbury Town	1–1	Torquay United

Group 4
Team	Pld	W	D	L	GF	GA	GD	Pts
Gillingham	2	1	1	0	4	1	+3	4
Maidstone United	2	1	0	1	4	5	−1	3
Bournemouth	2	0	1	1	1	3	−2	1

Date	Team 1	Score	Team 2
6 Nov	Bournemouth	0–0	Gillingham
27 Nov	Gillingham	4–1	Maidstone United
11 Dec	Maidstone United	3–1	Bournemouth

Group 5
Team	Pld	W	D	L	GF	GA	GD	Pts
Exeter City	2	1	1	0	3	2	+1	4
Hereford United	2	0	2	0	3	3	0	2
Cardiff City	2	0	1	1	1	2	−1	1

Date	Team 1	Score	Team 2
13 Nov	Cardiff City	0–1	Exeter City
28 Nov	Exeter City	2–2	Hereford United
11 Dec	Hereford United	1–1	Cardiff City

Group 6
Team	Pld	W	D	L	GF	GA	GD	Pts
Southend United	2	2	0	0	14	2	+12	6
Aldershot	2	1	0	1	4	11	−7	3
Reading	2	0	0	2	2	7	−5	0

Date	Team 1	Score	Team 2
6 Nov	Southend United	10–1	Aldershot
27 Nov	Aldershot	3–1	Reading
7 Dec	Reading	1–4	Southend United

Group 7
Team	Pld	W	D	L	GF	GA	GD	Pts
Mansfield Town	2	2	0	0	5	1	+4	6
Northampton Town	2	0	1	1	2	3	−1	1
Stoke City	2	0	1	1	1	4	−3	1

Date	Team 1	Score	Team 2
6 Nov	Stoke City	1–1	Northampton Town
27 Nov	Northampton Town	1–2	Mansfield Town
8 Jan	Mansfield Town	3–0	Stoke City

Group 8
Team	Pld	W	D	L	GF	GA	GD	Pts
Brentford	2	1	1	0	3	1	+2	4
Fulham	2	1	1	0	3	1	+2	4
Leyton Orient	2	0	0	2	0	4	−4	0

Date	Team 1	Score	Team 2
12 Nov	Leyton Orient	0–2	Fulham
17 Nov	Fulham	1–1	Brentford
29 Jan	Brentford	2–0	Leyton Orient

Group 3 play-off
Team	Pld	W	D	L	GF	GA	GD	Pts
Torquay United	2	2	0	0	8	2	+6	6
Swansea City	2	1	0	1	4	4	0	3
Shrewsbury Town	2	0	0	2	4	10	−6	0

Date	Team 1	Score	Team 2
16 Jan	Shrewsbury Town	2–6	Torquay United
23 Jan	Swansea City	4–2	Shrewsbury Town
28 Jan	Torquay United	2–0	Swansea City

== First round ==
=== Northern Section ===
Date	Home team	Score	Away team
8 January	Preston North End	2 – 1	Darlington
15 January	Doncaster Rovers	0–0	Scunthorpe United
Scunthorpe United won 4–3 on penalties
15 January	Tranmere Rovers	3–0	Rotherham United
22 January	Bradford City	3–2	Hartlepool United
22 January	Burnley	3 – 2	Stockport County
22 January	Halifax Town	0–1	Blackpool
22 January	Wigan Athletic	2–0	Rochdale
22 January	York City	1–2	Bury

=== Southern Section ===
Date	Home team	Score	Away team
8 January	Gillingham	0–1	Hereford United
8 January	Southend United	2–0	Maidstone United
23 January	Exeter City	1–0	Aldershot
28 January	Cambridge United	1–0	Walsall
18 February	Birmingham City	0–0	Swansea City
Birmingham City won 4–2 on penalties
19 February	Mansfield Town	2–1	Fulham
19 February	Torquay United	2–0	Northampton Town
21 February	Brentford	0–0	Wrexham
Brentford won 3–0 on penalties

== Quarter-finals ==
=== Northern Section ===
Date	Home team	Score	Away team
29 January	Bradford City	0–1	Burnley
29 January	Scunthorpe United	1–4	Preston North End
29 January	Tranmere Rovers	2–0	Blackpool
29 January	Wigan Athletic	2–0	Bury

=== Southern Section ===
Date	Home team	Score	Away team
20 February	Exeter City	0–1	Cambridge United
26 February	Birmingham City	2–0	Mansfield Town
26 February	Southend United	7–0	Torquay United
28 February	Hereford United	0–2	Brentford

== Area semi-finals ==
=== Northern Section ===
Date	Home team	Score	Away team
19 February	Preston North End	6–1	Burnley
19 February	Wigan Athletic	0–3	Tranmere Rovers

=== Southern Section ===
Date	Home team	Score	Away team
5 March	Birmingham City	3–1	Cambridge United
5 March	Southend United	0–3	Brentford

== Area finals ==
=== Northern Area final ===
5 March 1991

Tranmere Rovers	4–0	Preston North End
	Report

Prenton Park, Birkenhead
Attendance: 8,633
9 April 1991

Preston North End	(1) 1 – 0 (4)	Tranmere Rovers
	Report

Deepdale, Preston
Attendance: 5,763

=== Southern Area final ===
26 March 1991

Birmingham City	2–1	Brentford

St. Andrews, Birmingham
Attendance: 16,219
9 April 1991

Brentford	(1) 0 – 1 (3)	Birmingham City

Griffin Park, Brentford
Attendance: 8,745

== Final ==
26 May 1991
15:00 BST

Birmingham City	3–2	Tranmere Rovers
Sturridge 20'; Gayle 40', 84'	Report	Cooper 60'; Steel 68'

Wembley Stadium, London
Attendance: 58,756
Referee: J.Martin (Alton)

== Notes ==
General

- statto.com

Specific
