= List of Everton F.C. seasons =

The following lists Everton's League performances, top goalscorers and average attendances from 1888–89, when the Football League was formed, to the end of the most recent completed season. For a more detailed history see History of Everton F.C.

The 98 full seasons in the 20th century were reduced to 87 deducting the war years. Everton competed in 83 top flight seasons in the 20th century, the highest of any club. Everton averaged a top flight position of 8.15. Everton were founder members of the Football League in 1888 and were champions of it for the first time in 1890–91. By the time World War II broke out in 1939, they had been league champions 5 times and had fielded some of the biggest names in English football, including goalkeeper Ted Sagar and forwards Dixie Dean and Tommy Lawton. In Everton's title-winning season of 1927–28, Dean scored a record 60 league goals in a single season – still an English record.

Everton originally played at Anfield until a dispute with their landlord in 1892 saw the club exit the ground, which was re-occupied by the newly formed Liverpool, who gradually became Everton's fierce local rivals. Everton, meanwhile, settled into nearby Goodison Park, where they played until the end of the 2024–25 season, moving to the Hill Dickinson Stadium at the start of the 2025–26 season.

Everton hold the record of playing most seasons in the top flight of English football, only playing 4 seasons outside the first tier since the creation of the Football League in 1888. The club have played at the top level continuously since 1954; only Arsenal have a longer unbroken run at this level.

After World War II, Everton's first major success came in 1963, when they won the league title under the management of Harry Catterick, who also added another league title to Everton's club honours in 1970, as well as the FA Cup in 1966 and 2 Charity Shields in 1963 and 1970.

Another golden era at Everton prevailed, after the appointment of Howard Kendall as manager in 1981. Everton won the FA Cup in 1984 and won the league title in 1985, when they also won their first European trophy in the shape of the European Cup Winners' Cup. Another league title in 1987 and 3 consecutive Charity Shields in 1984, 1985 and 1986 also followed. Everton also won a fourth consecutive Charity Shield in 1987 under the management of Colin Harvey.

Everton's only trophies after 1987 came in 1995 when they won the FA Cup and the Charity Shield under the management of Joe Royle, who, like Catterick, Kendall and Harvey had also been with the club during his playing career. Since the formation of the FA Premier League in 1992, their highest league finish has been 4th in 2004–05; on three occasions (1997–98, 2003–04 and 2022–23), they have finished 17th, one place above the relegation zone.

The appointment of David Moyes as manager in March 2002, brought something of a turning point in Everton's recent history, as he re-established the club as regulars in the top places of the Premier League, although he failed to add any trophies, the club being finalists in the 2009 FA Cup final. Moyes departed in July 2013 after 11 years as Everton manager, to take charge of Manchester United, being succeeded by Roberto Martinez, who had a promising first season but was sacked after three seasons to be replaced by Ronald Koeman. Koeman was dismissed in October 2017, with the club lying in 18th position during the initial stages of the 2017–18 season. Koeman was replaced by Sam Allardyce in November 2017, with the team eventually finishing 8th in the Premier League, that season. Allardyce had his 18-month contract terminated by the board at the end of the season.

On 31 May 2018, Everton appointed Marco Silva, as their new manager. Silva had originally been approached to become the club's manager in October 2017, following the dismissal of Koeman. However, at the time, he was still the manager of Watford and any proposed deal at that time, fell through. Silva was sacked by Watford in January 2018, after a run of bad results in the Premier League. Everton's pursuit of Silva resurfaced after the club parted company with Allardyce.

On 6 December 2019, Silva was sacked after a poor run of results left the club in the relegation zone. Silva had won 24 and lost 24 of his league games as Everton manager. On 21 December 2019, Carlo Ancelotti was appointed as the club's new manager on a four-and-a-half-year contract. However, he left the club on 1 June 2021, returning to coach Real Madrid. On 30 June 2021, Rafael Benítez was appointed, becoming just the second man to manage both Everton and Liverpool. His reign, however, only lasted 6 months; he was sacked on 16 January 2022, making him the shortest-serving permanent manager in Everton's history. Frank Lampard replaced him at the end of the month, but he was also sacked on 23 January 2023, barely lasting a year. A week after Lampard's dismissal on 30 January 2023, Sean Dyche was appointed as new Everton manager. He too was sacked almost two years later on 9 January 2025, having only won 3 league games during the first half of the season. Two days later on 11 January 2025, David Moyes agreed on a two-and-a-half-year contract to return as the club's manager after almost 12 years.

== Seasons ==
=== 1887–1955 ===
Season	League statistics									Cup results		Top scorer(s)		Avg. Attend.
Season	League	Tier	Pld	W	D	L	GD	Pts	Pos	FA Cup	Charity Shield	League	Overall	Avg. Attend.
1887–88	No league football was played in 1887–88.									R2	N/A	G. Farmer (2)	G. Farmer (2)	6,000
1888–89	First Division	1	22	9	2	11	−12	20	8	DNE	N/A	E. Chadwick (6)	E. Chadwick (6)	7,308
1889–90	First Division	1	22	14	3	5	+25	31	2	R2	N/A	F. Geary (21)	F. Geary (25)	9,627
1890–91	First Division	1	22	14	1	7	+34	29	1	R1	N/A	F. Geary (20)	F. Geary(20)	11,200
1891–92	First Division	1	26	12	4	10	0	28	5	R1	N/A	A. Latta (17)	A. Latta (17)	11,009
1892–93	First Division	1	30	16	4	10	+23	36	3	RU	N/A	F. Geary (19)	F. Geary (23)	12,964
1893–94	First Division	1	30	15	3	12	+33	33	6	R1	N/A	**J. Southworth** (27)	J. Southworth (27)	13,000
1894–95	First Division	1	30	18	6	6	+32	42	2	QF	N/A	J. Bell (15)	J. Bell (18)	16,060
1895–96	First Division	1	30	16	7	7	+23	39	3	QF	N/A	A. Milward (17)	A. Milward (19)	15,454
1896–97	First Division	1	30	14	3	13	+5	31	7	RU	N/A	J. Bell (15)	J. Bell (17)	15,913
1897–98	First Division	1	30	13	9	8	+9	35	4	SF	N/A	L. Bell (12)	L. Bell (15)	15,380
1898–99	First Division	1	34	15	8	11	+7	38	4	R2	N/A	J. Proudfoot (12)	J. Proudfoot (13)	15,529
1899–1900	First Division	1	34	13	7	14	−2	33	11	R1	N/A	J. Settle (10)	J. Settle (10)	13,531
1900–01	First Division	1	34	16	5	13	+13	37	7	R2	N/A	J. Taylor (11)	J. Taylor (12)	16,765
1901–02	First Division	1	34	17	7	10	+23	43	2	R1	N/A	**J. Settle** (18)	J. Settle (18)	16,647
1902–03	First Division	1	34	13	6	15	+3	32	12	QF	N/A	J. Brearley (7)	J. Bell (7) J. Brearley (7)	15,616
1903–04	First Division	1	34	19	5	10	+27	43	3	R1	N/A	A. 'S' Young (10)	A. 'S' Young (10)	18,412
1904–05	First Division	1	34	21	5	8	+27	47	2	SF	N/A	A. 'S' Young (14)	A. 'S' Young (14)	18,412
1905–06	First Division	1	38	15	7	16	+4	37	11	Winners	N/A	A. 'S' Young (12)	A. 'S' Young (14)	18,412
1906–07	First Division	1	38	20	5	13	+24	45	3	RU	N/A	**A. 'S' Young** (28)	A. 'S' Young (29)	19,579
1907–08	First Division	1	38	15	6	17	−1	36	11	QF	DNQ	A. 'S' Young (16)	A. 'S' Young (21)	17,316
1908–09	First Division	1	38	18	10	10	+25	46	2	R2	DNQ	**B. Freeman** (38)	B. Freeman (38)	23,579
1909–10	First Division	1	38	16	8	14	−5	40	10	SF	DNQ	B. Freeman (22)	B. Freeman (26)	19,667
1910–11	First Division	1	38	19	7	12	+14	45	4	R3	DNQ	G. Beare (8) B. Lacey (8) A. 'S' Young (8)	A. 'S' Young (11)	19,389
1911–12	First Division	1	38	20	6	12	+4	46	2	QF	DNQ	T. Browell (12)	T. Browell (19)	18,211
1912–13	First Division	1	38	15	7	16	−6	37	11	QF	DNQ	T. Browell (12)	T. Browell (16)	19,368
1913–14	First Division	1	38	12	11	15	−9	35	15	R1	DNQ	B. Parker (17)	B. Parker (17)	25,611
1914–15	First Division	1	38	19	8	11	+29	46	1	SF	DNQ	**B. Parker** (36)	B. Parker (38)	18,556
No competitive football was played between 1915 and 1919 due to World War I
1919–20	First Division	1	42	12	14	16	+1	38	16	R1	DNQ	B. Kirsopp (14)	B. Kirsopp (14)	28,238
1920–21	First Division	1	42	17	13	12	+11	47	7	QF	DNQ	C. Crossley (15)	C. Crossley (18)	37,189
1921–22	First Division	1	42	12	12	18	+2	36	20	R1	DNQ	S. Fazackerley (12)	S. Fazackerley (12)	31,700
1922–23	First Division	1	42	20	7	15	+4	47	5	R1	DNQ	W. Chadwick (13) W. Williams (13)	W. Chadwick (13) W. Williams (13)	30,476
1923–24	First Division	1	42	18	13	11	+9	49	7	R2	DNQ	**W. Chadwick** (28)	W. Chadwick (30)	28,319
1924–25	First Division	1	42	12	11	19	−20	35	17	R3	DNQ	J. Broad (8)	W. Chadwick (9)	25,310
1925–26	First Division	1	42	12	18	12	+2	42	11	R3	DNQ	W. 'D' Dean (32)	W. 'D' Dean (33)	26,876
1926–27	First Division	1	42	12	10	20	−9	34	20	R4	DNQ	W. 'D' Dean (21)	W. 'D' Dean (24)	31,403
1927–28	First Division	1	42	20	13	9	+36	53	1	R4	DNQ	**W. 'D' Dean** (60)	W. 'D' Dean (63)	37,440
1928–29	First Division	1	42	17	4	21	−12	38	18	R3	Winners	W. 'D' Dean (26)	W. 'D' Dean (28)	29,512
1929–30	First Division	1	42	12	11	19	−12	35	22	R4	DNQ	W. 'D' Dean (23)	W. 'D' Dean (25)	32,989
1930–31	Second Division	2	42	28	5	9	+55	61	1	SF	DNQ	W. 'D' Dean (39)	W. 'D' Dean (48)	26,039
1931–32	First Division	1	42	26	4	12	+52	56	1	R3	DNQ	**W. 'D' Dean** (45)	W. 'D' Dean (46)	35,454
1932–33	First Division	1	42	16	9	17	+7	41	11	Winners	Winners	W. 'D' Dean (24)	W. 'D' Dean (33)	26,414
1933–34	First Division	1	42	12	16	14	−1	40	14	R3	RU	T. White (14)	T. White (14)	27,160
1934–35	First Division	1	42	16	12	14	+1	44	8	QF	DNQ	W. 'D' Dean (26)	W. 'D' Dean (27)	26,232
1935–36	First Division	1	42	13	13	16	0	39	16	R3	DNQ	J. Cunliffe (23)	J. Cunliffe (23)	29,118
1936–37	First Division	1	42	14	9	19	+3	37	17	R5	DNQ	W. 'D' Dean (24)	W. 'D' Dean (27)	30,292
1937–38	First Division	1	42	16	7	19	+4	39	14	R4	DNQ	**T. Lawton** (28)	T. Lawton (30)	35,040
1938–39	First Division	1	42	27	5	10	+36	59	1	QF	DNQ	**T. Lawton** (34)	T. Lawton (38)	35,040
Very little competitive football was played between 1939 and 1946 due to World War II. (Note: The 1939–40 Football League season was abandoned after only three weeks of competition in mid-September. The Wartime League was created to replace the suspended Football League during the war.)
1945–46	No league football was played in 1945–46.									R3				
1946–47	First Division	1	42	17	9	16	−5	43	10	R4	DNQ	J. Dodds (17)	J. Dodds (17)	40,855
1947–48	First Division	1	42	17	6	19	−14	40	14	R5	DNQ	J. Dodds (13)	J. Dodds (14)	44,205
1948–49	First Division	1	42	13	11	18	−22	37	18	R4	DNQ	E. Wainwright (10)	E. Wainwright (10)	45,138
1949–50	First Division	1	42	10	14	18	−24	34	18	SF	DNQ	E. Wainwright (11)	E. Wainwright (13)	43,936
1950–51	First Division	1	42	12	8	22	−38	32	22	R3	DNQ	J. McIntosh (11)	J. McIntosh (11)	42,924
1951–52	Second Division	2	42	17	10	15	+6	44	7	R3	DNQ	J. W. Parker (15)	J. W. Parker (16)	37,391
1952–53	Second Division	2	42	12	14	16	−4	38	16	SF	DNQ	T. Eglington (14)	J. W. Parker (17)	32,629
1953–54	Second Division	2	42	20	16	6	+34	56	2	R5	DNQ	J. W. Parker (31)	J. W. Parker (33)	44,493
1954–55	First Division	1	42	16	10	16	−6	42	11	R4	DNQ	J. W. Parker (19)	J. W. Parker (19)	46,394

=== 1955–present ===
The first UEFA club competition, the European Cup, currently known as the UEFA Champions League, was created for the 1955–56 season.

Season	League statistics									Cup results				Top scorer(s)		Avg. Attend.
Season	League	Tier	Pld	W	D	L	GD	Pts	Pos	FA Cup	EFL Cup	Charity Shield	UEFA Competitions	League	Overall	Avg. Attend.
1955–56	First Division	1	42	15	10	17	−14	40	15	QF	N/A	DNQ	DNQ	J. Harris (19)	J. Harris (21)	42,768
1956–57	First Division	1	42	14	10	18	−18	38	15	R5	N/A	DNQ	DNQ	T. McNamara (10)	T. McNamara (10)	35,069
1957–58	First Division	1	42	13	11	18	−10	37	16	R4	N/A	DNQ	DNQ	E. Thomas (15)	J. Harris (15) E. Thomas (15)	39,157
1958–59	First Division	1	42	17	4	21	−18	38	16	R5	N/A	DNQ	DNQ	D. Hickson (17)	D. Hickson (22)	39,154
1959–60	First Division	1	42	13	11	18	−5	37	15	R3	N/A	DNQ	DNQ	B. Collins (14)	B. Collins (14)	40,788
1960–61	First Division	1	42	22	6	14	+18	50	5	R3	QF	DNQ	DNQ	R. Vernon (21)	R. Vernon (22)	43,448
1961–62	First Division	1	42	20	11	11	+34	51	4	R5	DNE	DNQ	DNQ	R. Vernon (26)	R. Vernon (28)	41,432
1962–63	First Division	1	42	25	11	6	+42	61	1	R5	DNE	DNQ	ICFC–1R	R. Vernon (24)	R. Vernon (27)	51,460
1963–64	First Division	1	42	21	10	11	+20	52	3	R5	DNE	Winners	EC–Pre	R. Vernon (18)	R. Vernon (21)	49,401
1964–65	First Division	1	42	17	15	10	+9	49	4	R4	DNE	DNQ	ICFC–3R	F. Pickering (27)	F. Pickering (37)	42,062
1965–66	First Division	1	42	15	11	16	−6	41	11	Winners	DNE	DNQ	ICFC–2R	F. Pickering (18)	F. Pickering (22)	38,498
1966–67	First Division	1	42	19	10	13	+19	48	6	QF	DNE	RU	CWC–2R	A. Ball (15)	A. Ball (18)	42,606
1967–68	First Division	1	42	23	6	13	+27	52	5	RU	R3	DNQ	DNQ	A. Ball (20)	A. Ball (20) J. Royle (20)	46,983
1968–69	First Division	1	42	21	15	6	+41	57	3	SF	R4	DNQ	DNQ	J. Royle (22)	J. Royle (29)	45,958
1969–70	First Division	1	42	29	8	5	+41	66	1	R3	R4	DNQ	DNQ	J. Royle (23)	J. Royle (23)	49,531
1970–71	First Division	1	42	12	13	17	−6	37	14	SF	DNE	Winners	EC–QF	J. Royle (17)	J. Royle (23)	41,090
1971–72	First Division	1	42	9	18	15	−11	36	15	R5	R2	DNQ	DNQ	D. Johnson (9) J. Royle (9)	D. Johnson (11)	37,242
1972–73	First Division	1	42	13	11	18	−8	37	17	R4	R2	DNQ	DNQ	J. Connolly (7) J. Harper (7) J. Royle (7)	J. Harper (8)	34,471
1973–74	First Division	1	42	16	12	14	+2	44	7	R4	R2	DNQ	DNQ	M. Lyons (9)	M. Lyons (9)	35,351
1974–75	First Division	1	42	16	18	8	+14	50	4	R4	R3	DNQ	DNQ	B. Latchford (17)	B. Latchford (19)	40,021
1975–76	First Division	1	42	15	12	15	−6	42	11	R3	R4	DNQ	UEFA–1R	B. Latchford (12)	B. Latchford (13)	27,115
1976–77	First Division	1	42	14	14	14	−2	42	9	SF	RU	DNQ	DNQ	B. Latchford (17)	B. Latchford (25)	30,046
1977–78	First Division	1	42	22	11	9	+31	51	3	R4	QF	DNQ	DNQ	**B. Latchford** (30)	B. Latchford (32)	39,513
1978–79	First Division	1	42	17	17	8	+12	51	4	R3	R4	DNQ	UEFA–2R	A. King (12)	B. Latchford (20)	35,456
1979–80	First Division	1	42	9	17	16	−8	35	19	SF	R4	DNQ	UEFA–1R	B. Kidd (10)	B. Kidd (18)	28,711
1980–81	First Division	1	42	13	10	19	−3	36	15	QF	R3	DNQ	DNQ	P. Eastoe (15)	P. Eastoe (19)	26,112
1981–82	First Division	1	42	17	13	12	+6	64	8	R3	R4	DNQ	DNQ	G. Sharp (15)	G. Sharp (15)	24,672
1982–83	First Division	1	42	18	10	14	+18	64	7	QF	R3	DNQ	DNQ	G. Sharp (15)	G. Sharp (17)	20,310
1983–84	First Division	1	42	16	14	12	+2	62	7	Winners	RU	DNQ	DNQ	A. Heath (12)	A. Heath (18)	19,288
1984–85	First Division	1	42	28	6	8	+45	90	1	RU	R4	Winners	CWC–Winners	G. Sharp (21)	G. Sharp (27)	32,131
1985–86	First Division	1	42	26	8	8	+46	86	2	RU	R4	Winners	Ban on English teams	**G. Lineker** (30)	G. Lineker (40)	32,388
1986–87	First Division	1	42	26	8	8	+45	86	1	R5	QF	Winners (shared)	Ban on English teams	T. Steven (14)	A. Heath (16) K. Sheedy (16) T. Steven (16)	32,977
1987–88	First Division	1	40	19	13	8	+26	70	4	R5	SF	Winners	Ban on English teams	G. Sharp (13)	G. Sharp (22)	27,782
1988–89	First Division	1	38	14	12	12	+5	54	8	RU	R4	DNQ	Ban on English teams	T. Cottee (13)	T. Cottee (18)	27,787
1989–90	First Division	1	38	17	8	13	+11	59	6	R5	R4	DNQ	Ban on English teams	T. Cottee (13)	T. Cottee (15)	26,353
1990–91	First Division	1	38	13	12	13	+4	51	9	QF	R3	DNQ	DNQ	T. Cottee (10)	T. Cottee (24)	25,127
1991–92	First Division	1	42	13	14	15	+4	53	12	R4	R4	DNQ	DNQ	P. Beardsley (15)	P. Beardsley (20)	23,140
1992–93	Premier League	1	42	15	8	19	−2	53	13	R3	R4	DNQ	DNQ	T. Cottee (12)	T. Cottee (13)	20,457
1993–94	Premier League	1	42	12	8	22	−21	44	17	R3	R4	DNQ	DNQ	T. Cottee (16)	T. Cottee (19)	22,901
1994–95	Premier League	1	42	11	17	14	−7	50	15	Winners	R2	DNQ	DNQ	P. Rideout (14)	P. Rideout (16)	31,368
1995–96	Premier League	1	38	17	10	11	+20	61	6	R4	R2	Winners	CWC–2R	A. Kanchelskis (16)	A. Kanchelskis (16)	35,439
1996–97	Premier League	1	38	10	12	16	−13	42	15	R4	R2	DNQ	DNQ	D. Ferguson (10)	D. Ferguson (11) G. Speed (11)	36,188
1997–98	Premier League	1	38	9	13	16	−15	40	17	R3	R3	DNQ	DNQ	D. Ferguson (11)	D. Ferguson (11)	35,355
1998–99	Premier League	1	38	11	10	17	−5	43	14	QF	R4	DNQ	DNQ	K. Campbell (9)	K. Campbell (9)	34,866
1999–2000	Premier League	1	38	12	14	12	+10	50	13	QF	R2	DNQ	DNQ	K. Campbell (12)	K. Campbell (12)	34,866
2000–01	Premier League	1	38	11	9	18	−14	42	16	R4	R2	DNQ	DNQ	K. Campbell (9)	K. Campbell (10)	34,131
2001–02	Premier League	1	38	11	10	17	−12	43	15	QF	R2	DNQ	DNQ	D. Ferguson (6) T. Radzinski (6)	D. Ferguson (8)	34,004
2002–03	Premier League	1	38	17	8	13	−1	59	7	R3	R4	DNQ	DNQ	T. Radzinski (11)	K. Campbell (12)	38,481
2003–04	Premier League	1	38	9	12	17	−12	39	17	R4	R4	DNQ	DNQ	W. Rooney (9)	D. Ferguson (9) W. Rooney (9)	38,837
2004–05	Premier League	1	38	18	7	13	−1	61	4	R5	R4	DNQ	DNQ	T. Cahill (11)	T. Cahill (12)	36,834
2005–06	Premier League	1	38	14	8	16	−15	50	11	R4	R3	DNQ	CL–3Q; UEFA–1R	J. Beattie (10)	J. Beattie (11)	36,827
2006–07	Premier League	1	38	15	13	10	+16	58	6	R3	R4	DNQ	DNQ	A. Johnson (11)	A. Johnson (12)	36,739
2007–08	Premier League	1	38	19	8	11	+22	65	5	R3	SF	DNQ	UEFA–R of 16	Yakubu (15)	Yakubu (21)	36,955
2008–09	Premier League	1	38	17	12	9	+18	63	5	RU	R3	DNQ	UEFA–R1	T. Cahill (8) M. Fellaini (8)	T. Cahill (9) M. Fellaini (9)	35,667
2009–10	Premier League	1	38	16	13	9	+11	61	8	R4	R4	DNQ	EL–R of 32	L. Saha (13)	L. Saha (15)	36,725
2010–11	Premier League	1	38	13	15	10	+6	54	7	R5	R3	DNQ	DNQ	T. Cahill (9)	J. Beckford (10) L. Saha (10)	36,039
2011–12	Premier League	1	38	15	11	12	+10	56	7	SF	R4	DNQ	DNQ	N. Jelavić (9)	N. Jelavić (11)	33,228
2012–13	Premier League	1	38	16	15	7	+15	63	6	QF	R3	DNQ	DNQ	M. Fellaini (11)	M. Fellaini (12)	36,356
2013–14	Premier League	1	38	21	9	8	+22	72	5	QF	R3	DNQ	DNQ	R. Lukaku (15)	R. Lukaku (16)	37,732
2014–15	Premier League	1	38	12	11	15	−2	47	11	R3	R3	DNQ	EL–R of 16	R. Lukaku (10)	R. Lukaku (20)	38,406
2015–16	Premier League	1	38	11	14	13	+4	47	11	SF	SF	DNQ	DNQ	R. Lukaku (18)	R. Lukaku (25)	38,228
2016–17	Premier League	1	38	17	10	11	+18	61	7	R3	R3	DNQ	DNQ	R. Lukaku (25)	R. Lukaku (26)	39,494
2017–18	Premier League	1	38	13	10	15	−14	49	8	R3	R4	DNQ	EL–GS	W. Rooney (10)	W. Rooney (11)	38,797
2018–19	Premier League	1	38	15	9	14	+8	54	8	R4	R3	DNQ	DNQ	G. Sigurðsson (13) Richarlison (13)	G. Sigurðsson (14) Richarlison (14)	38,780
2019–20	Premier League	1	38	13	10	15	−12	49	12	R3	QF	DNQ	DNQ	D. Calvert-Lewin (13) Richarlison (13)	D. Calvert-Lewin (15) Richarlison (15)	39,256
2020–21	Premier League	1	38	17	8	13	−1	59	10	QF	QF	DNQ	DNQ	D. Calvert-Lewin (16)	D. Calvert-Lewin (21)	N/A (Note: All league fixtures bar one of the 2020–21 season were played behind closed doors due to the COVID-19 pandemic in the United Kingdom.)
2021–22	Premier League	1	38	11	6	21	−23	39	16	QF	R3	DNQ	DNQ	Richarlison (10)	Richarlison (11)	38,441
2022–23	Premier League	1	38	8	12	18	−23	36	17	R3	R3	DNQ	DNQ	D. McNeil (7)	D. McNeil (7)	39,232
2023–24	Premier League	1	38	13	9	16	−11	40	15	R4	QF	DNQ	DNQ	D. Calvert-Lewin (7) A. Doucouré (7)	D. Calvert-Lewin (8)	39,042
2024–25	Premier League	1	38	11	15	12	–2	49	13	R4	R3	DNQ	DNQ	I. Ndiaye (9)	I. Ndiaye (11)	39,173
2025–26	Premier League	1	38	13	10	15	–3	49	13	R3	R3	DNQ	DNQ	Beto (9)	Beto (10)	52,132

=== Key ===
- European competitions:
  - EC/CL – European Cup/Champions League
  - CWC – Cup Winners' Cup
  - ICFC – Inter-City Fairs Cup
  - UEFA/EL – UEFA Cup/Europa League
- Other:
  - N/A – Not applicable; competition yet to be founded or not held
  - DNE – Did not enter
  - DNQ – Did not qualify
  - Pre, R1, R2, R3, R4, R5, R of 32, R of 16, QF, SF, RU, W – Tournament placing
  - Bolded goalscorers were top overall goalscorer in respective division/league.
- Background colours:
  - Gold – Winners
  - Silver – Runners-up
  - Red – Relegated
  - Green – Promoted

Notes:

- From 1888–89 to 1980–81, 2 points were awarded for a win. From 1981–82 to the present day, 3 points are awarded for a win.
- League Cup did not start until 1960–61 season.
- Some attendances figures are estimates.
