= Merseyside derby =

Rivalry between Liverpool FC and Everton

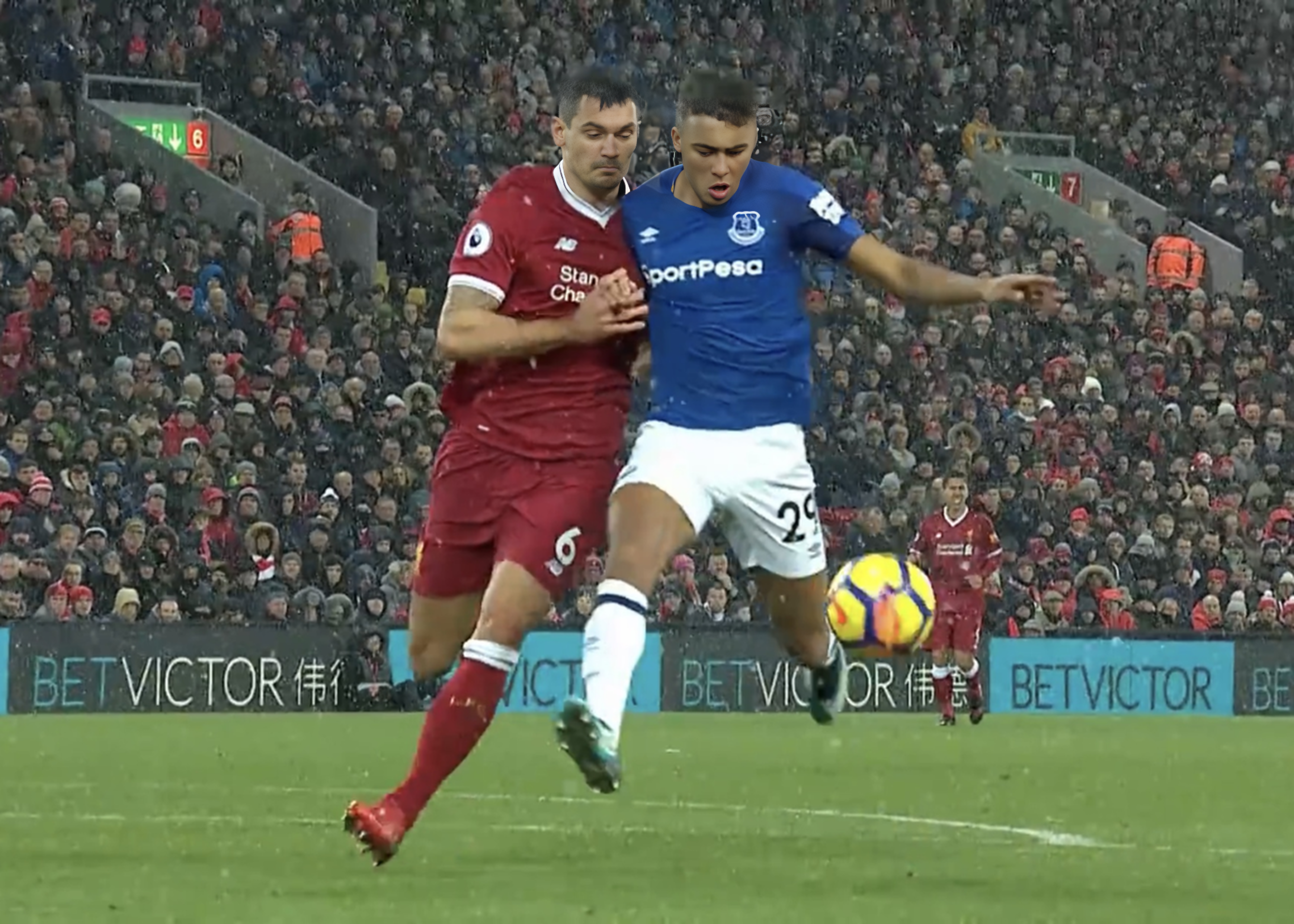
- The derby at Anfield on 10 December 2017
- Other names: The friendly derby
- Location: Liverpool
- Teams: Everton; Liverpool
- First meeting: 13 October 1894; First Division; Everton 3–0 Liverpool
- Latest meeting: 19 April 2026; Premier League; Everton 1–2 Liverpool
- Next meeting: 28 November 2026; Premier League; Everton v Liverpool
- Stadiums: Anfield (Liverpool); Goodison Park; Hill Dickinson Stadium (Everton)

Statistics
- Total meetings: 248
- Most wins: Liverpool (102)
- Most player appearances: Neville Southall (41)
- Top scorer: Ian Rush (25)
- All-time series: Liverpool: 102; Drawn: 78; Everton: 68
- Largest victory: Liverpool 6–0 Everton (1935)

The Merseyside derby is an association football match between Everton and Liverpool, two clubs based in Liverpool, Merseyside, England. It is the longest running top-flight derby in England, with its first official match being played on 13 October 1894. The derby has been played continuously since the 1962–63 season. Part of the rivalry is due to the close proximity of the two clubs' home grounds, being less than a mile apart and within sight of each other across Stanley Park, when Everton played at Goodison Park; they now play their home matches at Hill Dickinson Stadium in Vauxhall, while Liverpool still play theirs at Anfield.

The Merseyside derby was traditionally referred to as the "friendly derby" because of the large number of families in the city with both Everton and Liverpool supporters, and it was one of the few that did not enforce total fan segregation. The 1984 Football League Cup final at Wembley was nicknamed the "friendly final" due to almost all sections of the ground being mixed and supporters of both teams banding together to chant "Merseyside". The 1986 FA Cup final witnessed similar scenes of solidarity. Since the mid-1980s, the rivalry has intensified on and off the field, and has seen more red cards given than any other game since the creation of the Premier League. In the 2010s, the derby was dominated by Liverpool, arguably becoming the most one-sided in the English top-flight. Despite this, it has become more competitive in recent years.

== History ==
=== Early history ===
Everton Football Club were founded in 1878 and from 1884 played their home matches at Anfield, which was owned by club chairman John Houlding. Several board members of Everton were members of the Liberal Party, who were associated with the National Temperance Federation, whilst Houlding was a Conservative Party member and a brewer whose business interests were diametrically opposed to the temperance movement. Politics and disputes over money meant that Houlding was increasingly at odds with other members of the Everton board. Friction arose between the retention of an autocratic ownership structure versus the creation of a more democratic one which closely mapped the sociopolitical divide. The result was that the Everton directors vacated Anfield in 1892 and purchased a new ground at Goodison Park on the other side of Stanley Park. Houlding responded by creating a new club, Liverpool Football Club, to use Anfield.

The professional football clubs of the 1890s attracted much interest among the public, both on and off the field. The Representation of the People Act 1867 had given what would become football-attending masses the opportunity to vote in the local and national elections. Everton and Liverpool attendances would reach around 10–15,000 in a local authority ward with a population of 23,000. Local politicians saw involvement in the two football clubs as an opportunity to gain media exposure to the local electorate. Irish roots and religion are also sometimes considered as theories for the split on the grounds that Houlding was a prominent Orange Order member, while Everton's new chairman George Mahon was a rival Liberal Home Rule-advocating MP. Orangemen are strongly Unionist, whereas someone favouring home rule for Ireland was in favour of some degree of separation of the whole island of Ireland from the UK. The city of Liverpool has more Irish blood than any other city in the UK, with the possible exception of Glasgow, and division between Protestant and Catholic groups in Ireland closely matched the division between Unionism and Republicanism in Liverpool. However, at the time of the split, James Clement Baxter was the only Catholic among the Everton committee members whereas the rest were Protestants.

During the 1960s, Liverpool and Everton were regular winners of domestic trophies, but while Liverpool went from strength to strength in the 1970s and 1980s, Everton went through a relatively barren spell after their 1970 title triumph and did not win a major trophy for the next 14 years.

=== 1980s ===
Everton, however, started to emerge as a serious threat to Liverpool's dominance of the domestic scene following the appointment of Howard Kendall as manager at the start of the 1981–82 season. The first Merseyside derby that Kendall oversaw was at Anfield on 7 November, when his side lost 3–1 to Bob Paisley's. This saw Liverpool standing seventh in the league and Everton 13th. An identical scoreline followed in the return game at Goodison Park in late March, by which time Liverpool had overcome a dismal start to the season to muscle in on a title race which they eventually won, while Everton were still mid-table.

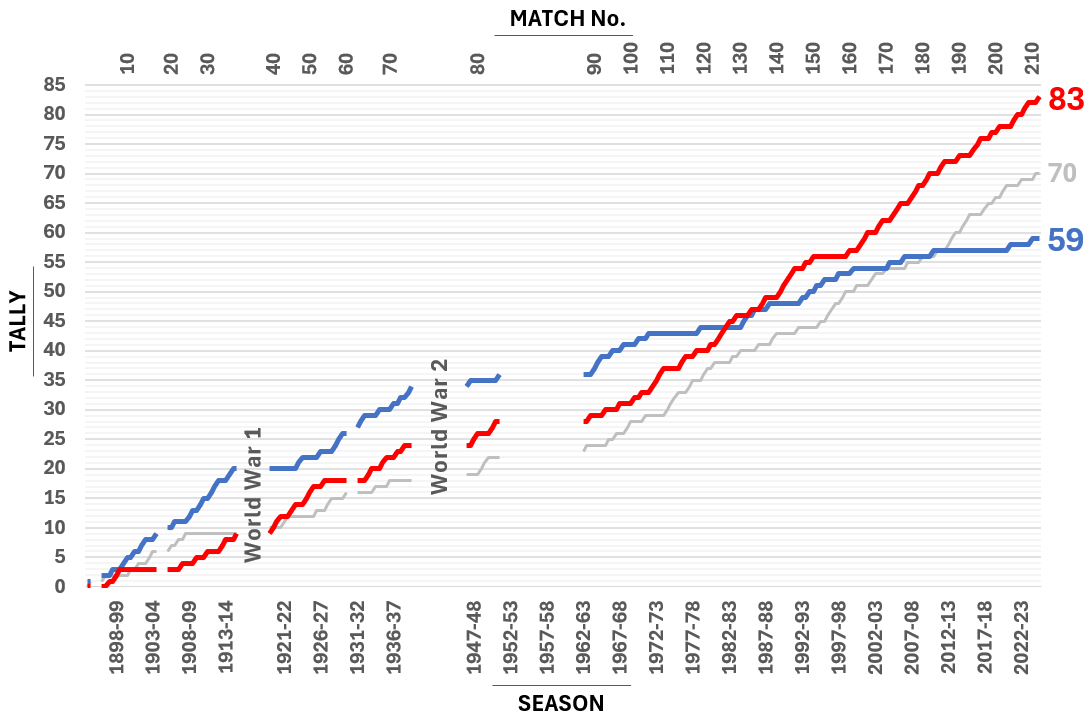
Historical league game outcomes from the Merseyside derby as of April 2025. Key: Everton wins ■; Liverpool wins ■; Draws ■.

In 1982–83, the final season of Bob Paisley's management before he retired to make way for Joe Fagan, Liverpool were champions once again with Everton finishing mid-table, and the most notable of the two derbies occurred in early November when Liverpool triumphed 0–5 at Goodison Park. The return match at Anfield in mid-March brought a goalless draw.

1983–84 was the season when Everton (who won the FA Cup at the end of the campaign) started to emerge as a serious threat to Liverpool. Though Liverpool won the league title and Everton still could not make the top five, Liverpool needed a replay to defeat Everton 1–0 in the League Cup final at Wembley. The Anfield derby in early November saw Liverpool triumph 3–0, while the clash at Goodison Park four months later ended in a 1–1 draw.

The 1984–85 season began with a Merseyside derby in the FA Charity Shield at Wembley, when league champions Liverpool faced FA Cup winners Everton in a game which Everton won 1–0 due to an own goal by Bruce Grobbelaar. The first league clash came on 20 October 1984, when a 0–1 win for Everton at Anfield saw Howard Kendall's team occupy fourth place in the league and show signs of challenging for the title for the first time in his four seasons in charge, while Liverpool were a lowly 17th and just 2 points outside the relegation zone. Liverpool's final game of the season came on 23 May when they lost 1–0 to Everton (who still had two games left to play) at Goodison Park. Everton had been crowned champions by this stage, while Liverpool had rallied since their terrible start to the season to occupy second place.

In the 1985–86 season, Liverpool and Everton competed against each other for both the league title and the FA Cup. The first Merseyside derby of the season came at Goodison Park on 21 September 1985 and was won 2–3 by Liverpool, who stood second behind Manchester United while Everton occupied sixth place. Everton triumphed 0–2 in the return match at Anfield five months later, by which time Everton had just taken over from Manchester United as league leaders and Liverpool were eight points behind them in second place. The climax to this campaign came at Wembley Stadium when Liverpool and Everton contested the first Merseyside derby FA Cup final on 10 May 1986. An early goal by Gary Lineker suggested that Everton could gain revenge on Liverpool for beating them to the league title by defeating them in the FA Cup final, but in the second half the tables were turned as a double from Ian Rush and another goal from Craig Johnston made Liverpool only the fifth English club to complete the double.

The 1986 FA Charity Shield was shared between Liverpool and Everton, who drew 1–1 at Wembley, but the first league derby of the season between the two clubs did not happen until late November in a goalless draw at Goodison Park. Both clubs were challenging for the title at this stage alongside Arsenal (leaders), Nottingham Forest and unlikely contenders Luton Town and Coventry City. The League Cup quarter-final on 21 January 1987 saw Liverpool win 0–1 at Goodison Park. The Anfield derby in late April saw Liverpool triumph 3–1, but it was not enough to prevent Everton from winning the title within the next couple of weeks. The 1986–87 season was the last time that Everton overshadowed Liverpool until 2005.

In the 1988–89 season, Everton were Liverpool's first opponents in a competitive game after the Hillsborough disaster on 15 April 1989, which resulted in the deaths of 96 Liverpool fans at the FA Cup semi-final. The game between the two sides was a league fixture on 3 May which ended in a goalless draw. On 20 May, the two sides met at Wembley for the second all Merseyside FA Cup final in four seasons. The match went into extra time before Liverpool triumphed 3–2, with Ian Rush (twice) and John Aldridge scoring for Liverpool and both of Everton's goals coming from Stuart McCall.

=== 1990s ===
Side-by-side comparison of Everton's and Liverpool's final league positions beginning in 1889

By 1990–91, Everton were in something of a slump (finishing ninth that season having started the season near the foot of the table), while Liverpool finished second in the league, but the campaign still brought one of the most pulsating clashes between the two clubs. Liverpool and Everton were drawn for the FA Cup fifth round at Anfield on 17 February 1991. The match ended in a goalless draw, and the replay three days later ended in a thrilling 4–4 draw at Goodison Park, in which Peter Beardsley scored twice. 1990–91 was Kenny Dalglish's last season as Liverpool manager, as he resigned two days after the 4–4 draw with Everton. It was also the last season of "replays of replays" as penalties after extra time took over as the competition's ultimate tie winner decider for the 1991–92 season. The second replay ended with a 1–0 win for Everton on 27 February, and ended the Reds double hopes.

The close season of 1991 saw Peter Beardsley move from Liverpool to Everton, followed within a year by defender Gary Ablett, causing more tension in the Merseyside derby, though the first couple of years after their transfers saw Liverpool and Everton firmly overtaken by Manchester United and the likes of Blackburn Rovers and Arsenal as the biggest challengers in English football. On 7 December 1992, in the first derby of the Premier League era, Everton defeated Liverpool 2–1 at Goodison Park in a game where Peter Beardsley became only the second man in history to score for both clubs in the derby after David Johnston.

The 1993–94 derby at Anfield saw Liverpool defeat Everton 2–1, not having much effect for a mid-table Liverpool side but increasing the risk of relegation (a battle which was ultimately won) for Everton. Perhaps the most notable event of this game was the winning goal by Robbie Fowler, who turned 19 the following month and was one of the most promising young players in England at the time. It was the last Merseyside derby Liverpool would win for five years during a period of success for Everton in the fixture. Joe Royle's appointment as Everton manager in November 1994 following Mike Walker's dismissal began with a 2–0 win over Liverpool at Goodison Park which lifted Everton from the bottom of the table and saw Duncan Ferguson score his first goal for the club. Royle's team followed it up with an away win at Anfield with two goals from Andrei Kanchelskis the following season. Everton's derby form at Goodison Park, despite the club's travails through most of the decade, was a strong suit in the 1990s, with five victories and no defeats at home in the ten years from February 1991.

In 1997–98, Everton triumphed 2–0 at Goodison in a victory that ultimately saved them from relegation (they only stayed up by having a greater goal difference than Bolton Wanderers) and helped end Liverpool's title bid. The following season Liverpool would end their barren run with a 3–2 victory over Everton at Anfield.

=== 2000s ===
The 2000–01 season saw one of the most exciting derbies of the Premier League era. Liverpool, having won the first derby at Anfield, completed the double with a thrilling 2–3 victory over Everton at Goodison in April, with the injury-time winner by Gary McAllister proving to be crucial at the end of the season in helping Liverpool qualify for the UEFA Champions League—which replaced the European Cup in 1992—for the first time.

By the end of the 2001–02, Liverpool had finished above Everton in the league for 15 seasons in succession. After a brilliant run of form saw Liverpool top the Premier League in October, an 11-match winless league run followed their 2–0 home win over West Ham United in early November and during that barren spell they drew 0–0 at home to an Everton side who were briefly above them in the table after several seasons of persistent relegation battles. However, they were on course for their fifth-place finish when they next met Everton on 19 April and won 1–2 at Goodison Park, a result which pushed their city neighbours towards seventh place and narrowly deprived them of European football.

In 2004–05, Everton finished fourth in the league and Liverpool came fifth, the first time since Everton's 1987 title win that Liverpool had finished below them. In a season which saw Liverpool win the Champions League title, Everton gave their neighbours a reminder of how far they had progressed under the management of David Moyes with a 1–0 win at Goodison Park on 11 December 2004, though Liverpool won the return match at Anfield 2–1 three months later.

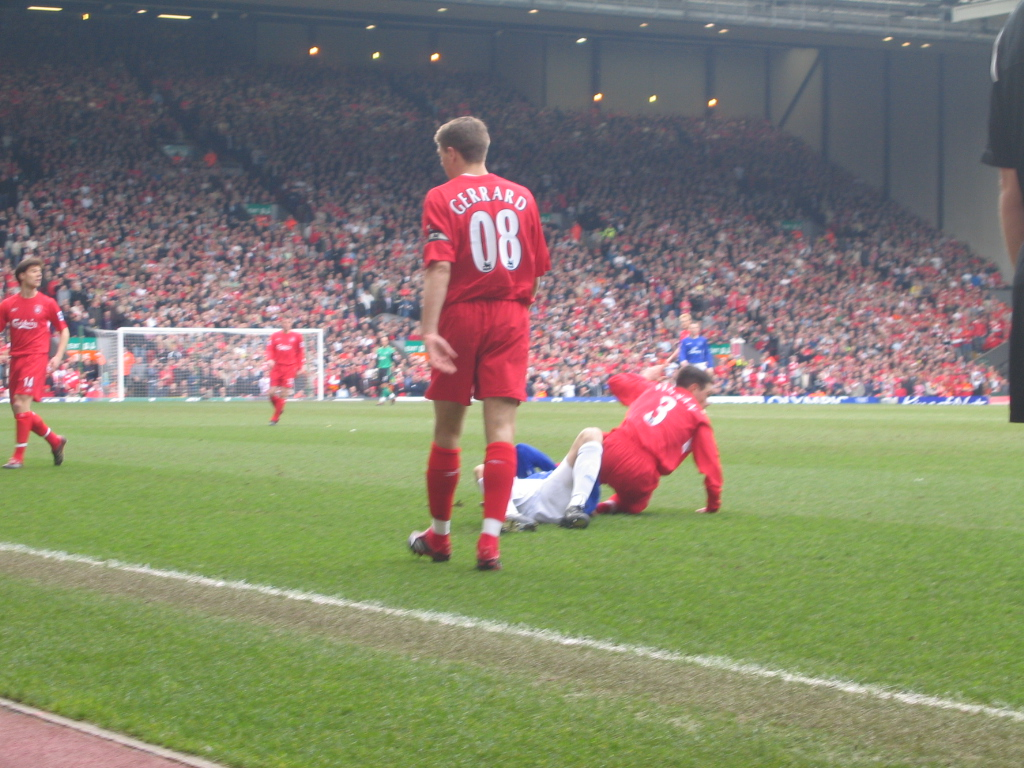
In the derby in March 2006, Steven Gerrard of Liverpool and James Beattie of Everton wore the number "08" as the city had been voted European Capital of Culture for 2008.

Everton had a setback and finished mid-table in 2005–06, while Liverpool's compensation for their prolonged title wait came in the form of a narrow FA Cup final triumph. Liverpool triumphed 3–1 in both of the Merseyside derbies that season.

In 2006–07, Everton recovered to finish in the top six, while Liverpool finished third, and there was an early season triumph for the blue half of Liverpool as Everton beat Liverpool 3–0 at Goodison Park in early September, in a game that saw an uncharacteristic mistake from Liverpool 'keeper Pepe Reina. They also held them to a goalless draw at Anfield in early February.

Liverpool did the double over Everton in 2007–08. The first meeting of the sides that season saw one of the most controversial derbies in recent memory, with Everton finishing an ill-tempered game with 9 men. Everton took a first half lead as Sami Hyypiä skewed a left footed clearance into his own goal from a corner. The scoreline was levelled by Dirk Kuyt from the penalty spot after Everton's Tony Hibbert fouled Steven Gerrard in the area. Referee Mark Clattenburg earned the ire of the Goodison faithful as Steven Gerrard appeared to persuade him to change his mind in favour of a red card after first brandishing a yellow. Kuyt was fortunate to escape with a yellow card following a two-footed, aerial lunge on Phil Neville. Liverpool's pressure against the 10 men eventually told, as Liverpool were awarded a second penalty when Neville handled a goal bound shot from derby debutante Lucas Leiva. Neville was dismissed and Everton finished the game two players short. Kuyt scored his second goal of the game from the spot as Liverpool won the game 2–1. The victory helped secure a top-four finish and Champions League qualification for Liverpool, leaving Everton to settle for a UEFA Cup place. Referee Clattenburg was not chosen to officiate again at Goodison Park after that match until December 2013, six years later, and in that period only officiated one Everton game, away at Aston Villa.

In the 2008–09 season, Liverpool and Everton met four times, Liverpool winning the League encounter at Goodison Park 0–2 while drawing the other League fixture that dealt a blow to their title ambitions. The FA Cup saw Everton defeat ten-man Liverpool in extra time in the replay thanks to an injury-time winner by Dan Gosling after a 1–1 draw at Anfield. Both teams enjoyed strong campaigns in the Premier League, as Liverpool challenged for the title and Everton qualified for Europe finishing in fifth place and 9 points adrift of the Champions League places. Everton also progressed to the 2009 FA Cup final, but lost to Chelsea, despite taking the lead through a Louis Saha goal after just 25 seconds – the fastest goal ever scored in an FA Cup Final until İlkay Gündoğan's goal against Manchester United in the 2023 FA Cup final.

=== 2010s ===
When the sides met in the 2009–10 season, both clubs were suffering from a poor start to the season. Liverpool won the first meeting at Goodison Park with a 2–0 victory despite Everton enjoying a greater share of possession for the game, with poor finishing and the heroics of Pepe Reina costing the home side. The following game saw 10-man Liverpool win 1–0 following a first-half red card for Greek centre-half Sotirios Kyrgiakos. The Greek fiercely contested a tackle with Fellaini who was fortunate to escape similar punishment having caught the centre-back high on the shin. A solitary goal from Kuyt was enough to secure the three points, as the Dutchmen nodded home smartly from a Steven Gerrard corner.

In the Goodison Park encounter on 17 October 2010 in the 2010–11 season, Everton won 2–0 with goals from Tim Cahill and Mikel Arteta, while the return league game at Anfield in January 2011 ended in a 2–2 draw. This was the last win for Everton in the derby in all competitions for more than a decade, failing to win in the following 23 games whilst losing 11 times.

In the 2011–12 season, Liverpool and Everton met three times, twice in the league and once in the FA Cup, with Liverpool winning all three. The first meeting took place on 1 October 2011, with Liverpool winning 0–2 in the league at Goodison Park (goals from Andy Carroll and Luis Suárez) against an Everton side depleted by Jack Rodwell's early, controversial red card, which was later rescinded by The Football Association. On 13 March 2012, Liverpool won the Anfield fixture 3–0 after a hat-trick by Steven Gerrard, who became the first player to score a hat-trick in the derby since Ian Rush in 1982. The third meeting of the season was the FA Cup semi-final at Wembley on 14 April. Everton took the lead through Nikica Jelavić's goal in the first half. Liverpool equalized through a Luis Suárez goal midway through the second half, and Andy Carroll scored the winning goal for Liverpool in the 87th minute. However, despite Liverpool having success throughout the season against their traditional rivals, Everton finished one place higher than Liverpool at the end of the Premier League season, whilst the Reds finished the season as the winners of the League Cup.

In the 2013–14 season, the two sides contested an eventful 3–3 draw at Goodison Park, with the lead changing on three separate occasions between both teams. Later that season, Liverpool beat Everton 4–0 at Anfield during the beginning of an improbable title challenge for the Reds. The result was replicated in the 2015–16 season, as Liverpool again ran out 4–0 winners in Jürgen Klopp's first experience of the Merseyside derby. The game was notable for a Ramiro Funes Mori red card which saw in-form striker Divock Origi injured – the Belgian missed the remainder of the season. The result ended a run of three consecutive draws in the fixture, which was Everton's best streak in the derby for six years.

Liverpool won both derbies in Klopp's first full season at the club, as dominance continued from the Red half of Merseyside. Sadio Mané scored an injury time winner at Goodison Park in December 2016, following a Daniel Sturridge left footed shot that rebounded off the post. The second meeting was a more straightforward affair for the Reds, with a 3–1 victory following goals from Mané, Philippe Coutinho and Origi.

In the 2017–18 season, Mohamed Salah scored a curling left footed effort for the Reds, which would go on to win the 2018 FIFA Puskás Award for goal of the year, picking up 38% of the public vote. The match ended in a 1–1 draw, after returning Evertonian Wayne Rooney equalized with a penalty.

In the following season, Divock Origi scored one of the most memorable goals ever witnessed in a Merseyside derby. With the score goalless after 90 minutes, Virgil van Dijk volleyed a speculative effort towards goal which skewed off his boot and high into the air. Everton goalkeeper Jordan Pickford attempted to catch the ball but missed, as it came back down off the crossbar in front of the waiting Origi, who nodded in the winner in the sixth minute of added time. The return game in March 2019 ended in a 0–0 draw at Goodison Park and saw Liverpool move down to second place, where they remained until the end of the season.

=== Since 2019 ===
The first meeting of the following season saw Liverpool, whose Champions league win was some compensation for their failure to secure the Premier League, welcoming a struggling Everton to Anfield. The Reds had surged into an early lead at the top of the Premier League table while the Toffees sat just above the relegation zone, which lead to the derby being described as perhaps "the most unbalanced meeting" in recent years. Liverpool won the match 5–2 despite playing a rotated side, and soon after Everton sacked their manager, Marco Silva. The return league fixture, which was both sides' first match in the Premier League since the season had been halted due to the COVID-19 pandemic, was played on 21 June 2020 behind closed doors at Goodison Park, and ended in a goalless draw.

In between these two games, on 5 January 2020, a Liverpool team largely made up of reserves and teenagers defeated Everton 1–0 in the third round of the FA Cup at Anfield, with the winning goal coming from a curling strike outside of the area, courtesy of 18 year-old Toxteth born Curtis Jones.

The first meeting of the 2020–21 season saw Everton, with a 100 percent record after four games, welcome champions Liverpool to Goodison Park. The game ended in a 2–2 draw after Jordan Henderson's strike to make it 3–2 to Liverpool in second half stoppage time was ruled out by VAR. With 23 matches unbeaten in the Merseyside derby, Liverpool set a new club record for highest number of games unbeaten against the same opponent. The record lasted only until the return game at Anfield on 20 February 2021, which Everton won 2–0, their first win at Anfield in any competition since 1999. The defeat was also a fourth consecutive home defeat for Liverpool, a run not endured since 1923.

In the 2021–22 season, goals from Jordan Henderson, Mohamed Salah (two) and Diogo Jota saw Liverpool record a 4–1 away win against Everton in the Premier League, the club's biggest winning margin at Goodison since a 5–0 victory in 1982, as Liverpool became the first team in English top-flight history to score at least two goals in 18 successive games in all competitions. The victory also took Liverpool ahead of Everton in the number of wins in Everton's home stadium. In the reverse fixture at Anfield in April, Liverpool won 2–0, with goals from Andy Robertson and Divock Origi, his sixth overall against Everton. This was the first season since 2016–17 that Liverpool did the double over their rivals. The following season saw another 0–0 draw in the fixture, with Liverpool supporter Conor Coady scoring what looked to be a winner only for the VAR to rule it out. In the reverse fixture, an Everton side coming off a win against league leaders Arsenal went to Anfield under new manager Sean Dyche. Liverpool won 2–0 with goals from Salah and Cody Gakpo. The second goal would the latter's first for Liverpool.

The 2023–24 season saw Liverpool win 2–0 with a Salah brace at Anfield, but also featured Everton's first derby win in three years, and their first win at Goodison Park in 14. Goals from Jarrad Branthwaite and Dominic Calvert-Lewin secured a 2–0 victory by the Blues on 24 April 2024, greatly increasing Everton's odds of survival from relegation and significantly reducing Liverpool's title hopes in the process. Some Everton fans reportedly chanted "You lost the league at Goodison Park" towards the end of the game.

In the 2024–25 season, Liverpool travelled to Everton on 12 February 2025, Beto opened the scoring in the 11th minute, slotting it past Alisson, however their celebrations were short lived as Alexis Mac Allister quickly equalised for Liverpool in the 16th minute. Mohamed Salah put Liverpool 2–1 up in the 73rd minute; during added time, James Tarkowski scored the equaliser with a volley. However, the game was massively overshadowed by an incident at full time. Abdoulaye Doucouré, following the final whistle, went to celebrate in front of the Liverpool fans, angering Curtis Jones, who ran and attacked Doucouré. Both players, including Arne Slot and Sipke Hulshoff, ended up getting sent off by referee Michael Oliver. It was also the last ever derby at Goodison Park. On 2 April 2025, Everton travelled to Anfield for the second match of the derby, with Liverpool winning 1–0 when Diogo Jota scored the only goal of the match in the 57th minute. This was his last ever goal, because he would die along with his brother André Silva in a car accident three months later. On 27 April 2025, Liverpool supporters celebrated their second Premier League title and their 20th English league title win, during which unexpected blue flares went off during the celebration. This incident was traced back to an Everton fan who reportedly bought 10,000 blue flares and resold them to Liverpool fans, disguised as red flares, as a prank.

=== The friendly derby ===
There are a number of reasons for the "friendly derby" name. Firstly, both of the clubs' home grounds are situated in the north of the city and are very close to each other (just under a mile) with only Stanley Park separating them. From 1902 to 1932, the two clubs even shared the same match day programme. Today there are no evident geographical, political, social, or religious divides as there are in other derbies, although a sectarian divide did exist within the city for many years. It is unclear how, if at all, this influenced the support bases of the two clubs and research conducted in 2013 indicated that it was more likely to have been a political allegiance that influenced support.

During the 1950s and 1960s, Everton became known as the Catholic club mainly as a result of successful Irish players such as Tommy Eglington, Peter Farrell, and Jimmy O'Neill, as well as manager Johnny Carey. This in turn caused Liverpool to be thought of as the Protestant club, especially as they did not sign an Irish Catholic player until Ronnie Whelan in 1979. A comparison of the two Merseyside clubs in relation the differences existing between Glasgow Celtic and Glasgow Rangers has been made in David Kennedy's 2017 book Merseyside's Old Firm?

Unlike many other local derbies, violence between Everton and Liverpool supporters in Liverpool itself is a rarity. In the fallout from the Heysel Stadium disaster, fan relationships became strained when the actions of Liverpool-supporting hooligans caused both Liverpool and Everton to be banned from European club competition despite no involvement from the latter. Relations improved after the Hillsborough disaster when both sets of fans rallied together, with Evertonians even joining in on the boycott of The Sun, while Everton and Liverpool scarves were intertwined and stretched across Stanley Park between the two teams' stadiums. After the murder of 11-year-old Evertonian Rhys Jones in 2007, Liverpool invited his parents and older brother to Anfield for a Champions League match as a sign of respect. The Z-Cars theme tune, to which Everton players traditionally run out, was played for the first time ever at Anfield while Jones' family stood on the pitch wearing Everton shirts and scarves. A standing ovation was then given before "You'll Never Walk Alone" was played. Upon the vindication of Liverpool fans related to the Hillsborough disaster in August 2012, Everton hosted Newcastle United at Goodison Park, and the sides were led out by two children wearing Everton and Liverpool shirts with numbers 9 and 6 on the back; an announcer read out the names of all 96 Hillsborough victims while "He Ain't Heavy, He's My Brother" played to a standing ovation.

=== Tranmere Rovers ===
Matches between Everton/Liverpool and Tranmere Rovers, based in Birkenhead on the other side of the River Mersey, are also classed as Merseyside derbies, but as Tranmere have spent all of their history outside the top flight, competitive matches are a rarity. They have occasionally faced Everton and Liverpool in cup competitions. Their last meeting with both clubs came in the FA Cup in 2001. Tranmere caused an upset by beating Everton 3–0 in the fourth round, before losing 4–2 to Liverpool in the quarter-finals.

== Statistics ==
As of 19 April 2026

Competition	Played	Everton wins	Draws	Liverpool wins	Everton goals	Liverpool goals
Football League First Division	146	48	44	54	181	203
Premier League	68	11	26	31	59	96
FA Cup	25	7	6	12	28	40
Football League/EFL Cup	4	1	1	2	1	2
FA Charity/Community Shield	3	1	1	1	2	2
Football League Super Cup	2	0	0	2	2	7
Total	248	68	78	102	273	350

== Honours ==
As of 27 April 2025

National competitions		Everton	Liverpool
English champions	First Division	9	18
English champions	Premier League	0	2
English champions	Total	9	20
FA Cup		5	8
League Cup		0	10
FA Community Shield		9	16
FL Super Cup		0	1
Total		23	55
European and international competitions		Everton	Liverpool
UEFA Champions League		0	6
UEFA Europa League		0	3
UEFA Cup Winners' Cup		1	0
UEFA Super Cup		0	4
FIFA Club World Cup		0	1
Total		1	14
Total		24	69
Regional competitions		Everton	Liverpool
Lancashire Senior Cup		7	13
Liverpool Senior Cup		47	41
Total		54	54
All competitions		Everton	Liverpool
Total		78	123

== Records ==
This derby is responsible for many records across all derby matches, largely due to it being contested on so many occasions:

- The longest unbeaten derby run in all competitions is held by Liverpool, with Everton failing to find victory in 23 consecutive games between 2011 and 2020. This streak is also the longest such run that Liverpool have had against any opponent in club history.
- The longest unbeaten derby run in home matches is held by Liverpool, with Everton failing to win in the league (plus two cup games) for 22 games between 2000 and 2020.
- The longest unbeaten derby run in away matches is held by Everton, with a 16-match run at Anfield between 1899 and 1920, which included ten victories.
- The longest unbroken winning run at home belongs to Liverpool, with five wins between the 1932–33 and 1936–37 seasons and 2021-22 and 2025-26
- The longest unbroken winning run away from home belongs to Everton, who won seven consecutive games at Anfield between the 1908–09 and 1914–15 seasons.
- Recent games have been marred by sendings off, and the fixture has seen 23 red cards in the Premier League, the highest tally for any fixture (though the 20th of these was subsequently rescinded by the FA). Former Liverpool captain Steven Gerrard and former Everton captain Phil Neville both saw red twice in derby games.

The following are records just for the Merseyside derby itself:

- The record home victory in a league match is 6–0, recorded by Liverpool at Anfield in the 1935–36 season.
- The record away victory in a league match is 5–0, recorded by both Everton at Anfield in the 1914–15 season, and by Liverpool at Goodison Park in the 1982–83 season.
- The highest-scoring match had 11 goals, when Liverpool won 7–4 at Anfield in the 1932–33 season.
- Neville Southall of Everton holds the record for most derby appearances, with 41 across all competitions.
- Ian Rush of Liverpool holds the mark for the most derby goals with 25, overtaking Dixie Dean of Everton's long-standing record when he scored a brace in Liverpool's 3–2 win over Everton in the second all-Merseyside FA Cup Final in 1989.
- William C. Cuff of Everton holds the record for the most wins as a manager, with 16 wins over Liverpool from 1901 to 1918.
- Tom Watson of Liverpool holds the record for the most losses as a manager, with 21 defeats to Everton from 1896 to 1915.
- Record attendance: 78,299 at Goodison Park, 18 September 1948 (First Division)
- Lowest attendance: 18,000 at Anfield, 19 January 1901 (First Division) (* does not include matches played behind closed doors due to the COVID-19 pandemic)

=== All-time top goalscorers ===
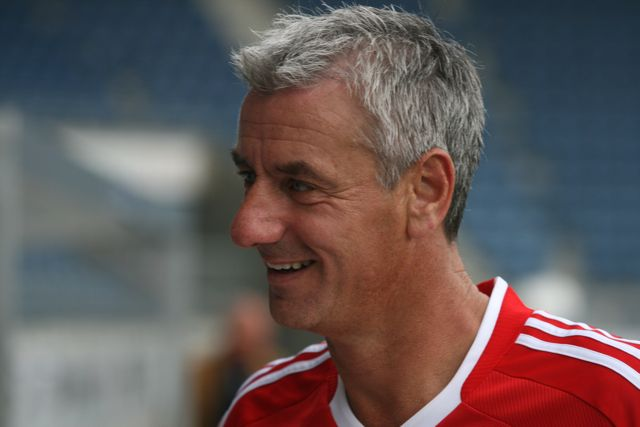
Ian Rush, top goalscorer in the derby with 25 goals for Liverpool

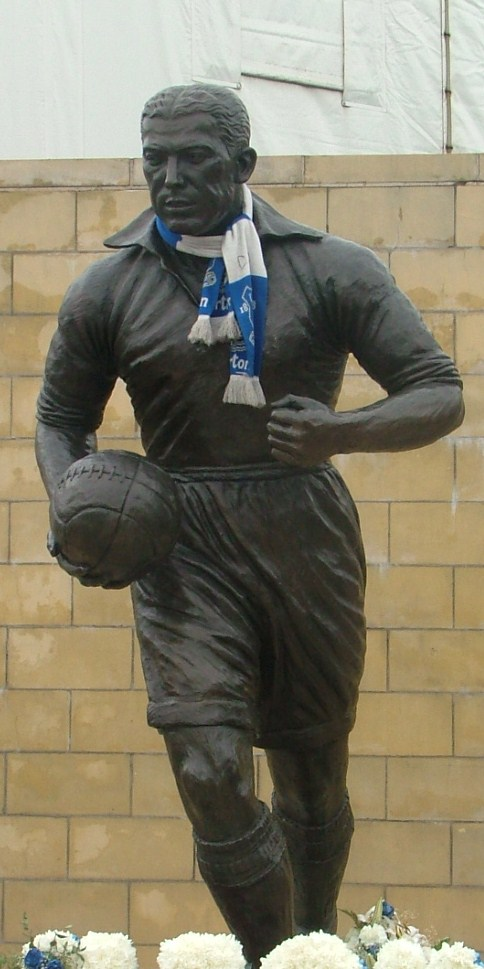
Statue of Dixie Dean, top league goalscorer in the derby with 18 goals for Everton

The following players have scored four or more goals in the derby. This includes Premier League matches, its predecessor the Football League First Division, the FA Cup, the League Cup, the Football League Super Cup and the Charity Shield. This list is correct as of the match played on 19 April 2026.

Dixie Dean is the top goalscorer in league games, with 18 goals, while Steven Gerrard and Mohamed Salah are the top goalscorers in the fixture in the Premier League era, with 9 goals each.

Nation	Player	Club(s)	League	FA Cup	League Cup	Charity Shield	Screen Sport	Overall	Years
(Wales)	Ian Rush	Liverpool	13	5	1	1	5	25	1980–1987; 1988–1996
(England)	Dixie Dean	Everton	18	1				19	1925–1937
(Scotland)	Alex "Sandy" Young	Everton	9	3				12	1901–1911
(England)	Steven Gerrard	Liverpool	9	1				10	1998–2015
(Egypt)	Mohamed Salah	Liverpool	9					9	2017–2026
(England)	Harry Chambers	Liverpool	8					8	1915–1928
(England)	Jimmy Settle	Everton	8					8	1899–1908
(England)	Jack Parkinson	Liverpool	6	2				8	1903–1914
(England)	Peter Beardsley	Liverpool / Everton	4/1	2/0				7	1987–1991 (L); 1991–1993 (E)
(Scotland)	Graeme Sharp	Everton	4	2			1	7	1980–1991
(England)	Jack Balmer	Liverpool	6					6	1935–1952
(England)	Robbie Fowler	Liverpool	6					6	1992–2001; 2006–2007
(Scotland)	Bobby Parker	Everton	6					6	1913–1922
(Belgium)	Divock Origi	Liverpool	6					6	2014–2022
(England)	Gordon Hodgson	Liverpool	5	1				6	1925–1936
(Australia)	Tim Cahill	Everton	5					5	2004–2012
(Scotland)	Kenny Dalglish	Liverpool	5					5	1977–1990
(England)	Fred Howe	Liverpool	5					5	1935–1938
(Scotland)	Jack Taylor	Everton	5					5	1896–1910
(England)	Alan Ball	Everton	5					5	1966–1971
(Netherlands)	Dirk Kuyt	Liverpool	5					5	2006–2012
(Uruguay)	Luis Suárez	Liverpool	4	1				5	2011–2014
(England)	Roger Hunt	Liverpool	4			1		5	1958–1969
(Scotland)	Duncan Ferguson	Everton	4					4	1994–1998; 2000–2006
(England)	Tommy Lawton	Everton	4					4	1936–1939
(England)	Michael Owen	Liverpool	4					4	1997–2004
(England)	Sam Raybould	Liverpool	4					4	1900–1907
(Wales)	Roy Vernon	Everton	4					4	1960–1965
(England)	Daniel Sturridge	Liverpool	4					4	2013–2019
(Senegal)	Sadio Mané	Liverpool	4					4	2016–2022

Current scorers: Current players with multiple derby goals: Liverpool's Mohamed Salah (9) and Virgil van Dijk (2) as well as Everton's Beto and Michael Keane (both 2).

Goals from "overseas" players: A total of 42 non-British (Isles) players from 24 countries have scored in the derby (not including own goals, which add 4 countries to the list) since Liverpool's Craig Johnston became the first such player to do so, in the 1986 Cup Final., though Bruce Grobelaar's own goal in the 1984 Charity Shield makes him technically the first "overseas" player to score a derby goal. Most recently Everton's Beto (Guinea-Bissau) and Liverpool's Alexis Mac Allister (Argentina) added the two newest countries to this list in the February 2025 match. Mohamed Salah (Egypt) is the leading "overseas" player with 9 goals. In terms of countries, France leads the way with five different scorers, but Australia and Netherlands are just behind, with four each.

More goals than years: Liverpool's Fred Howe and Everton's Tommy Lawton bear the distinction of scoring more goals than they actually spent in years in the city of Liverpool, with Howe scoring 5 goals in 3 years and Lawton 4 goals in 3 years.

Hat-tricks: The first derby hat-trick was scored by Everton's Alex "Sandy" Young, who scored 4 goals in a 5–1 win at Goodison in 1904. Other Evertonians to manage hat-ticks include Bobby Parker in 1914 and Dixie Dean twice, in 1928 and 1931, the last Everton player to net a treble. Liverpool hat-tricks have come from Chambers (1922), Forshaw (1925), Hanson (1933) and Howe (4 goals in 1935). Nearly 50 years passed before the next derby hat-trick, scored by Ian Rush, who managed 4 goals in a 5–0 win at Goodison in 1982; a further 30 years passed until Steven Gerrard scored a hat-trick against Everton at Anfield in a 3–0 win. Of all the league hat-tricks, only 2 (Young's in 1904 and Rush's in 1982) were managed at Goodison; all the others were at Anfield.

Own goals: Sandy Brown's famous own goal in Everton's championship winning 1969–70 season was, surprisingly, only the second own goal in the history of the fixture, the first having been scored by Balmer (Everton) in 1902. Since then, 8 Evertonians have been "credited" with an own goal, including 2 in the same match at Anfield in 1972. There have only been 3 Liverpool own goals. Leighton Baines's unlucky deflection at Goodison in the 2012–13 season is the most recent of all derby own goals.

Scoring in consecutive matches: Between May and September 1986, Ian Rush scored for Liverpool in 4 consecutive derbies, none of them league games (Cup final, Charity Shield and 2 Super Cup finals). Several players have scored in 3 consecutive games: Hardman (Everton, 1905–06), Freeman (Everton, 1909–10), Parkinson (Liverpool, 1910–11), King (Everton, 1978–79), Lineker (Everton, 1985–86), Barnes (Liverpool, 1989–90) and Fowler (Liverpool, 1995–96).

Youngest derby goalscorer: Although difficult to verify, since birthdates of early players are not always known, the youngest confirmed derby goalscorer is Everton's Danny Cadamarteri, who scored the winner at Goodison 6 days after his 18th birthday in October 1997.

=== All-time most appearances ===
Nation	Player	Club	Appearances	Years	Position
(Wales)	Neville Southall	Everton	41	1981–1998	Goalkeeper
(Wales)	Ian Rush	Liverpool	36	1980–1987; 1988–1996	Striker
(Zimbabwe)	Bruce Grobbelaar	Liverpool	34	1980–1994	Goalkeeper
(Scotland)	Alan Hansen	Liverpool	33	1977–1990	Defender
(Wales)	Kevin Ratcliffe	Everton	32	1980–1992	Defender

=== Clean sheets ===
Nation	Player	Club	Clean sheets	Games	Years
(England)	Ray Clemence	Liverpool	15	27	1967–1981
(Wales)	Neville Southall	Everton	15	41	1981–1998
(Zimbabwe)	Bruce Grobbelaar	Liverpool	10	34	1980–1994
(England)	Gordon West	Everton	9	20	1962–1973
(Scotland)	Tommy Lawrence	Liverpool	8	16	1957–1971
(Spain)	Pepe Reina	Liverpool	8	17	2005–2013
(Brazil)	Alisson	Liverpool	7	10	2018–present
(Wales)	Cyril Sidlow	Liverpool	6	10	1946–1952
(Republic of Ireland)	Billy Scott	Everton	6	15	1904–1912
(England)	Ted Sagar	Everton	6	20	1929–1953
(England)	Jordan Pickford	Everton	6	16	2017–present
(United States)	Tim Howard	Everton	5	18	2006–2016
(Northern Ireland)	Elisha Scott	Liverpool	5	20	1912–1917; 1919–1934
(Wales)	Dai Davies	Everton	3	5	1970–1977

=== Top 10 attendances for League derby games ===
Rank	Date	Stadium	Score	Att.
1	18 September 1948	Goodison Park	Everton 1–1 Liverpool	78,299
2	22 September 1962	Goodison Park	Everton 2–2 Liverpool	72,488
3	16 September 1950	Goodison Park	Everton 1–3 Liverpool	71,150
4	27 August 1949	Goodison Park	Everton 0–0 Liverpool	70,812
5	27 September 1947	Goodison Park	Everton 0–3 Liverpool	66,776
6	8 February 1964	Goodison Park	Everton 3–1 Liverpool	66,515
7	15 October 1927	Goodison Park	Everton 1–1 Liverpool	65,729
8	12 April 1965	Goodison Park	Everton 2–1 Liverpool	65,402
9	1 October 1938	Goodison Park	Everton 2–1 Liverpool	64,977
10	3 February 1968	Goodison Park	Everton 1–0 Liverpool	64,482

=== Decade average attendances for derby games ===
Period	Everton average	Liverpool average
2020*–	41,993	52,256
2010–2019	39,597	50,221
2000–2009	40,020	44,360
1990–1999	39,107	41,823
1980–1989	49,529	45,240
1970–1979	55,502	54,168
1962–1969	64,606	53,805
1946–1951	63,529	50,697
1931–1939	49,444	45,423
1919–1930	51,590	50,694
1905–1915	41,600	37,600
1894–1904	39,888	28,444

League games only. Highest ever attendance 100,000 estimate at 1984 Milk Cup final and 1984 Charity Shield. Highest attendance at Anfield 56,060 for the 1962–63 league game.

- Not including matches played behind closed doors due to COVID-19 pandemic.

=== Games on neutral ground ===
There have been twelve derby games played on neutral grounds: six at Wembley (both the old and new grounds), four at Maine Road and one each at Villa Park and Old Trafford:

Date	Competition	Venue	Score	Attendance
31 March 1906	FA Cup Semi-final	Villa Park	Everton 2–0 Liverpool	37,000
25 March 1950	FA Cup Semi-final	Maine Road	Liverpool 2–0 Everton	72,000
27 March 1971	FA Cup Semi-final	Old Trafford	Everton 1–2 Liverpool	62,144
23 April 1977	FA Cup Semi-final	Maine Road	Everton 2–2 Liverpool	56,637
27 April 1977	FA Cup Semi-final replay	Maine Road	Everton 0–3 Liverpool	56,579
25 March 1984	League Cup Final	Wembley	Everton 0–0 Liverpool (a.e.t.)	100,000
28 March 1984	League Cup Final replay	Maine Road	Everton 0–1 Liverpool	52,089
8 August 1984	FA Charity Shield	Wembley	Everton 1–0 Liverpool	100,000
10 May 1986	FA Cup Final	Wembley	Liverpool 3–1 Everton	98,000
16 August 1986	FA Charity Shield	Wembley	Everton 1–1 Liverpool	88,231
20 May 1989	FA Cup Final	Wembley	Liverpool 3–2 Everton (a.e.t.)	82,800
14 April 2012	FA Cup Semi-final	Wembley	Everton 1–2 Liverpool	87,231

=== Penalties ===
Since World War II, Everton have been awarded just 3 penalties at Anfield during derbies (all scored), while Liverpool have been awarded 11 at Goodison Park, of which 3 have been missed (though only one of these misses affected the final result).

== Crossing the park ==
Players transferring between the clubs are said to be "crossing the Park". The phrase refers to Stanley Park, which lies between Anfield and Goodison Park. Since Liverpool were formed when Everton left Anfield, which had been their home ground, the two players who stayed behind (Duncan McLean and Thomas G. Wylie) did not actually cross the park. The first player to have had both Anfield and Goodison as his home ground was Patrick Gordon.

Transfer embargo: Liverpool did not buy directly from Everton between 1959 and 2000, while there was a similar freeze in the opposite direction between 1961 and 1982.

Played for all 3: Dave Hickson, John Heydon and Frank Mitchell are the only 3 players to have played for Liverpool, Everton and Tranmere Rovers, the 3 main Merseyside clubs still in existence. New Brighton were football league members from 1923 to 1951; Bill Lacey and Neil McBain played for all 3 of Everton, Liverpool and New Brighton. John Whitehead played for Liverpool, Everton and also for Bootle in their one year as a league team (1892–93), before they were replaced in Division 2 by local rivals Liverpool.

The list below shows transfer dates and fees, where known.

Everton, then Liverpool

- Abel Xavier – 2002 – £750,000 (only player to play in derby matches for both teams in the same season)
- Nick Barmby – 2000 – £6 million (the highest fee Liverpool have paid Everton)
- Dave Hickson – 1959 – £12,000 (also played for Tranmere Rovers one of 6 players to play for 3 different Merseyside clubs)
- Tony McNamara – 1957 – £4,000
- John Heydon – 1949 – no fee (also played for Tranmere Rovers, one of 6 players to play for 3 different Merseyside clubs)
- Bill Harthill – 1936
- Jack Balmer – 1935 – no fee
- Thomas Johnson – 1934
- Frank Mitchell – 1919 (also played for Tranmere Rovers, one of 6 players to play for 3 different Merseyside clubs)
- Bill Lacey – 1912 – part of exchange deal for Uren (Lacey also played for New Brighton, one of 6 players to have played for 3 different Merseyside clubs)
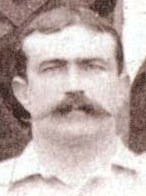
  Andrew Hannah, captain with both Everton and Liverpool
- Tom Gracie – 1912 – part of exchange deal for Uren
- Arthur Berry – Signed first for Liverpool in 1906, then played for Wrexham, Fulham, and Oxford University before signing for Everton. He returned directly to Liverpool from Everton for a brief spell in 1912.
- Don Sloan – 1908 – no fee
- David Murray – 1904
- Abe Hartley – 1897
- Alex Latta – 1896 (Did not make a senior appearance for Liverpool)
- Fred Geary – 1895 – £60
- John Whitehead – 1894 – (also played for Bootle), one of 6 players to have played for 3 different Merseyside clubs
- Patrick Gordon – 1893
- Duncan McLean – 1892; along with Wylie, the only 2 players to stay at Liverpool when Everton left Anfield.
- Thomas G. Wylie – 1892

The following played for other clubs before moving to Liverpool:

- Andrew Hannah – Played for Renton in between. (The first player to captain both Everton and Liverpool)
- Edgar Chadwick – Played for Blackburn Rovers and Burnley in between.
- David Johnson- Played for Ipswich Town in between; returned to Everton after playing for Liverpool.
- Neil McBain – Played for St Johnstone in between. He also played – under bizarre circumstances – one game for New Brighton: as manager he played one game in goal due to an injury crisis, at the age of 52, becoming the oldest player ever to play in a league game. He is one of 6 players to play for 3 different Merseyside clubs.
- Steve McMahon – Played for Aston Villa in between. He is also one of only 2 players to have captained both Everton and Liverpool.
- Darren Potter – Everton youth player who never made a first-team appearance, played for Blackburn Rovers in between.
- Billy Scott – Played for Leeds City in between.

Liverpool, then Everton

- Gary Ablett – 1992 – £750,000 (only player to win the FA Cup with both clubs).
- Peter Beardsley – 1991 – £1 million; was Everton's most expensive signing from Liverpool.
- Alan Harper – 1983 – £100,000; though on Liverpool's books, he never made a first-team appearance.
- Kevin Sheedy – 1982 – £100,000.
- David Johnson – 1982 – £100,000; started at Everton, went to Ipswich Town then Liverpool then back to Everton.
- Johnny Morrissey –1962 – £10,000
- Jimmy Payne – 1956 – £5,000
- Dick Forshaw – 1927 – only player to win the League Championship with both clubs
- Harold Uren – 1912 – part of exchange deal for Lacey and Gracie
- Benjamin Howard Baker – c. 1910

The following played for other clubs before moving to Everton:

- David Burrows – Played for West Ham United in between.
- Don Hutchison – Played for West Ham United and Sheffield United in between.
- Dave Watson – Played for Norwich City in between.
- John Gidman – Played for Aston Villa in between.
- Arthur Berry – Played for Wrexham, Fulham, and Oxford University in between Everton; returned to Liverpool for a brief spell in 1912.
- Andy Lonergan – Played for Stoke City and West Bromwich Albion before joining Everton.
- Conor Coady – Played for Sheffield United, Huddersfield and Wolves before joining Everton on loan.
- Sander Westerveld - Played for Real Sociedad, Real Mallorca and Portsmouth before joining Everton on loan, playing 2 games in 2006.

As well as players "crossing the park", Everton's first ever manager, William Edward Barclay, stayed at Anfield after Everton moved to Goodison Park to become Liverpool's first manager.

On 30 June 2021, former Liverpool manager Rafael Benítez signed a three-year contract with Everton. He was sacked on 16 January 2022.

=== Scored for both sides in a derby ===
Only three players have scored for both sides in a Merseyside derby:

- David Johnson scored on his Merseyside Derby debut for Everton in November 1971 and later scored 2 derby goals during his spell with Liverpool, the last of them on 1 March 1980.
- Peter Beardsley added to his tally of 6 derby goals for Liverpool with 1 goal for Everton on 7 December 1992.
- Sandy Brown famously scored an own goal in 1969 to add to his goal scored at the right end in 1966.

=== Boyhood allegiances ===
Liverpool's Evertonians

Player	Years	Ref.
(England) Adam Lallana	2014–2020	
(England) Stephen Wright	1997–2002	
(England) Jamie Carragher	1996–2013	
(England) David Thompson	1996–2000	
(England) Robbie Fowler	1992–2001; 2006–2007	
(England) Steve McManaman	1989–1999	
(England) Steve McMahon	1985–1991	
(Wales) Ian Rush	1980–1987; 1988–1996	

Everton's Liverpudlians

Player	Years	Ref.
(Denmark) Jesper Lindstrøm	2024–2025	
(England) Dele Alli	2022–2024	
(England) Conor Coady	2022–2023	
(England) Theo Walcott	2018–2021	
(Wales) Ashley Williams	2016–2019	
(England) Phil Jevons	1996–2001	
(England) Nick Barmby	1996–2000	
(England) Gary Ablett	1992–1996	
(England) Mike Newell	1989–1991	
(England) Dave Watson	1986–2001	
(England) Peter Reid	1982–1989	
(England) Alan Harper	1983–1988; 1991–1993	
(England) David Johnson	1969–1972; 1982–1984	

== Doubles ==
Liverpool have beaten Everton twice in a league season 17 times and Everton doing the inverse nine times, in what is known as the "double". With the occasional meeting at Wembley, both Everton and Liverpool have completed a "treble", in which a victory has been achieved three times (and at three different venues) in a season.

Everton

Season	Liverpool at home score	Everton at home score
1899–1900	1–2	3–1
1908–09	0–1	5–0
1911–12	1–3	2–1
1923–24	1–2	1–0
1928–29	1–2	1–0
1931–32	1–3	2–1
1938–39	0–3	2–1
1964–65	0–4	2–1
1984–85*	0–1	1–0

- Having won the Charity Shield 1–0, Everton completed a treble over Liverpool.

Liverpool

Season	Liverpool at home score	Everton at home score
1898–99	2–0	1–2
1920–21	1–0	0–3
1922–23	5–1	0–1
1924–25	3–1	0–1
1947–48	4–0	0–3
1972–73	1–0	0–2
1981–82	3–1	1–3
1989–90	3–1	1–2
1990–91	3–2	1–3
2000–01	3–1	2–3
2005–06	3–1	1–3
2007–08	1–0	1–2
2009–10	1–0	0–2
2011–12*	3–0	0–2
2016–17	3–1	0–1
2021–22	2–0	1–4
2025–26	2–1	1–2

- With a 2–1 win in the FA Cup semi-finals, Liverpool completed a treble over Everton.

With cup games, replays, and so on, the two have often met three or four times a season. In the 1986–87 season, they played each other 6 times, starting with a 1–1 draw at Wembley in the Charity Shield. There were the 2 league games, the two-legged Screen Sport Super Cup Final (held over from the previous season), and a League Cup fifth round tie. Despite the fact that Everton finished the season as champions, they could not beat Liverpool that year, with 2 draws and 4 losses.

Liverpool have achieved the most Premier League doubles over Everton, doing so eight times since 2000. Everton have yet to do the double over Liverpool in the Premier League – their last league double over Liverpool was in the 1984–85 season when they won 1–0 in both legs to complete a treble for that season, having also won 1–0 at Wembley in the Charity Shield.

== Full list of results ==
Fixtures from 1894 to the present day featuring League games, FA Cup, League Cup, Charity Shield and Super Cup sorted from the most recent. Testimonial matches are listed separately. Other friendlies and Inter-War fixtures are not included.

No. (Lg)	Date	Competition	Venue	Score	Liverpool scorers/red cards	Everton scorers/red cards	Attendance	Ref.
248 (214)	19 April 2026	25–26 Premier League	Hill Dickinson Stadium	1–2	Salah, Van Dijk	Beto	52,585	
247 (213)	20 September 2025	25–26 Premier League	Anfield	2–1	Gravenberch, Ekitike	Gueye	60,342	
246 (212)	2 April 2025	24–25 Premier League	Anfield	1–0	Jota		60,331	
245 (211)	12 February 2025	24–25 Premier League	Goodison Park	2–2	Mac Allister, Salah, (red card) Jones	Beto, Tarkowski, (red card) Doucouré	39,280	
244 (210)	24 April 2024	23–24 Premier League	Goodison Park	2–0		Branthwaite, Calvert-Lewin	39,222	
243 (209)	21 October 2023	23–24 Premier League	Anfield	2–0	Salah (1 pen.)	(red card) Young	50,201	
242 (208)	13 February 2023	22–23 Premier League	Anfield	2–0	Salah, Gakpo		53,027	
241 (207)	3 September 2022	22–23 Premier League	Goodison Park	0–0			39,240	
240 (206)	24 April 2022	21–22 Premier League	Anfield	2–0	Robertson, Origi		53,213	
239 (205)	1 December 2021	21–22 Premier League	Goodison Park	1–4	Henderson, Salah, Jota	Gray	39,641	
238 (204)	20 February 2021	20–21 Premier League	Anfield	0–2		Richarlison, Sigurðsson (pen.)	0 (Note: Behind closed doors)	
237 (203)	17 October 2020	20–21 Premier League	Goodison Park	2–2	Mané, Salah	Keane, Calvert-Lewin, (red card) Richarlison	0	
236 (202)	21 June 2020	19–20 Premier League	Goodison Park	0–0			0	
235	5 January 2020	19–20 FA Cup Rnd 3	Anfield	1–0	Jones		52,583	
234 (201)	4 December 2019	19–20 Premier League	Anfield	5–2	Origi, Shaqiri, Mané, Wijnaldum	Keane, Richarlison	53,094	
233 (200)	3 March 2019	18–19 Premier League	Goodison Park	0–0			39,335	
232 (199)	2 December 2018	18–19 Premier League	Anfield	1–0	Origi		51,756	
231 (198)	7 April 2018	17–18 Premier League	Goodison Park	0–0			39,220	
230	5 January 2018	17–18 FA Cup Rnd 3	Anfield	2–1	Milner (pen.), Van Dijk	Sigurðsson	52,513	
229 (197)	10 December 2017	17–18 Premier League	Anfield	1–1	Salah	Rooney (pen.)	53,082	
228 (196)	1 April 2017	16–17 Premier League	Anfield	3–1	Mané, Coutinho, Origi	Pennington	52,920	
227 (195)	19 December 2016	16–17 Premier League	Goodison Park	0–1	Mané		39,590	
226 (194)	20 April 2016	15–16 Premier League	Anfield	4–0	Origi, Sakho, Sturridge, Coutinho	(red card) Funes Mori	43,854	
225 (193)	4 October 2015	15–16 Premier League	Goodison Park	1–1	Ings	Lukaku	39,598	
224 (192)	7 February 2015	14–15 Premier League	Goodison Park	0–0			39,621	
223 (191)	27 September 2014	14–15 Premier League	Anfield	1–1	Gerrard	Jagielka	44,511	
222 (190)	28 January 2014	13–14 Premier League	Anfield	4–0	Gerrard, Sturridge, Suárez		44,450	
221 (189)	23 November 2013	13–14 Premier League	Goodison Park	3–3	Coutinho, Suárez, Sturridge	Mirallas, Lukaku	39,576	
220 (188)	5 May 2013	12–13 Premier League	Anfield	0–0			44,991	
219 (187)	28 October 2012	12–13 Premier League	Goodison Park	2–2	Baines (o.g.), Suárez	Osman, Naismith	39,613	
218	14 April 2012	11–12 FA Cup Semi-final	Wembley	2–1	Suárez, Carroll	Jelavić	87,231	
217 (186)	13 March 2012	11–12 Premier League	Anfield	3–0	Gerrard		44,921	
216 (185)	1 October 2011	11–12 Premier League	Goodison Park	0–2	Suárez, Carroll	(red card) Rodwell (subsequently rescinded)	39,510	
215 (184)	16 January 2011	10–11 Premier League	Anfield	2–2	Meireles, Kuyt (pen.)	Distin, Beckford	44,795	
214 (183)	17 October 2010	10–11 Premier League	Goodison Park	2–0		Cahill, Arteta	39,673	
213 (182)	6 February 2010	09–10 Premier League	Anfield	1–0	Kuyt – (red card) Kyrgiakos	(red card) Pienaar	44,316	
212 (181)	29 November 2009	09–10 Premier League	Goodison Park	0–2	Yobo (o.g.), Kuyt		39,652	
211	4 February 2009	08–09 FA Cup Rnd 4 Rep.	Goodison Park	1–0 (aet)	(red card) Lucas	Gosling	37,918	
210	25 January 2009	08–09 FA Cup Rnd 4	Anfield	1–1	Gerrard	Lescott	43,524	
209 (180)	19 January 2009	08–09 Premier League	Anfield	1–1	Gerrard	Cahill	44,382	
208 (179)	27 September 2008	08–09 Premier League	Goodison Park	0–2	Torres	(red card) Cahill	39,574	
207 (178)	30 March 2008	07–08 Premier League	Anfield	1–0	Torres		44,295	
206 (177)	20 October 2007	07–08 Premier League	Goodison Park	1–2	Kuyt (2 pens.)	Hyypiä (o.g.) – (red card) Hibbert, (red card) Neville	40,049	
205 (176)	3 February 2007	06–07 Premier League	Anfield	0–0			44,234	
204 (175)	9 September 2006	06–07 Premier League	Goodison Park	3–0		Cahill, Johnson	40,004	
203 (174)	25 March 2006	05–06 Premier League	Anfield	3–1	Neville (o.g.), García, Kewell – (red card) Gerrard	Cahill – (red card) Van der Meyde	44,923	
202 (173)	28 December 2005	05–06 Premier League	Goodison Park	1–3	Crouch, Gerrard, Cissé	Beattie – (red card) Arteta, (red card) Neville	40,158	
201 (172)	20 March 2005	04–05 Premier League	Anfield	2–1	Gerrard, García – (red card) Baroš	Cahill	44,224	
200 (171)	11 December 2004	04–05 Premier League	Goodison Park	1–0		Carsley	40,552	
199 (170)	31 January 2004	03–04 Premier League	Anfield	0–0			44,056	
198 (169)	30 August 2003	03–04 Premier League	Goodison Park	0–3	Owen, Kewell		40,200	
197 (168)	19 April 2003	02–03 Premier League	Goodison Park	1–2	Owen, Murphy	Unsworth – (red card) Weir, (red card) Naysmith	40,162	
196 (167)	22 December 2002	02–03 Premier League	Anfield	0–0			44,025	
195 (166)	23 February 2002	01–02 Premier League	Anfield	1–1	Anelka	Radzinski	44,371	
194 (165)	15 September 2001	01–02 Premier League	Goodison Park	1–3	Gerrard, Owen, Riise	Campbell	39,554	
193 (164)	16 April 2001	00–01 Premier League	Goodison Park	2–3	Heskey, Babbel, McAllister – (red card) Bišćan	Ferguson, Unsworth	40,260	
192 (163)	29 October 2000	00–01 Premier League	Anfield	3–1	Barmby, Heskey, Berger	Campbell – (red card) Gravesen	44,718	
191 (162)	21 April 2000	99–00 Premier League	Goodison Park	0–0			40,052	
190 (161)	27 September 1999	99–00 Premier League	Anfield	0–1	(red card) Westerveld, (red card) Gerrard	Campbell – (red card) Jeffers	44,802	
189 (160)	3 April 1999	98–99 Premier League	Anfield	3–2	Fowler, Berger	Dacourt, Jeffers	44,852	
188 (159)	17 October 1998	98–99 Premier League	Goodison Park	0–0			40,185	
187 (158)	23 February 1998	97–98 Premier League	Anfield	1–1	Ince	Ferguson	44,501	
186 (157)	18 October 1997	97–98 Premier League	Goodison Park	2–0		Ruddock (o.g.), Cadamarteri	40,112	
185 (156)	16 April 1997	96–97 Premier League	Goodison Park	1–1	Redknapp – (red card) Fowler	Ferguson – (red card) Unsworth	40,177	
184 (155)	20 November 1996	96–97 Premier League	Anfield	1–1	Fowler	Speed	40,751	
183 (154)	16 April 1996	95–96 Premier League	Goodison Park	1–1	Fowler	Kanchelskis	40,120	
182 (153)	18 November 1995	95–96 Premier League	Anfield	1–2	Fowler	Kanchelskis	40,818	
181 (152)	24 January 1995	94–95 Premier League	Anfield	0–0			39,505	
180 (151)	21 November 1994	94–95 Premier League	Goodison Park	2–0		Ferguson, Rideout	39,866	
179 (150)	14 March 1994	93–94 Premier League	Anfield	2–1	Fowler, Rush	Watson	44,281	
178 (149)	18 September 1993	93–94 Premier League	Goodison Park	2–0		Cottee, Ward	38,157	
177 (148)	20 March 1993	92–93 Premier League	Anfield	1–0	Rosenthal		44,619	
176 (147)	7 December 1992	92–93 Premier League	Goodison Park	2–1	Wright	Johnston, Beardsley	35,826	
175 (146)	28 December 1991	91–92 First Division	Goodison Park	1–1	Tanner	Johnston	37,681	
174 (145)	31 August 1991	91–92 First Division	Anfield	3–1	Burrows, Saunders, Houghton	Newell	39,072	
173	27 February 1991	90–91 FA Cup Rnd 5 R. 2	Goodison Park	1–0		Watson	40,201	
172	20 February 1991	90–91 FA Cup Rnd 5 Rep.	Goodison Park	4–4 (aet)	Beardsley, Rush, Barnes	Cottee, Sharp	37,766	
171	17 February 1991	90–91 FA Cup Rnd 5	Anfield	0–0			38,323	
170 (144)	9 February 1991	90–91 First Division	Anfield	3–1	Molby, Speedie	Nevin	38,127	
169 (143)	22 September 1990	90–91 First Division	Goodison Park	2–3	Beardsley, Barnes (pen.)	Hinchcliffe, McCall	39,847	
168 (142)	3 February 1990	89–90 First Division	Anfield	2–1	Barnes, Beardsley (pen.)	Sharp	38,730	
167 (141)	23 September 1989	89–90 First Division	Goodison Park	1–3	Barnes, Rush	Newell	42,453	
166	20 May 1989	88–89 FA Cup Final	Wembley	3–2 (aet)	Aldridge, Rush	McCall	82,800	
165 (140)	3 May 1989	88–89 First Division	Goodison Park	0–0			45,994	
164 (139)	11 December 1988	88–89 First Division	Anfield	1–1	Houghton	Clarke (pen.)	42,372	
163 (138)	20 March 1988	87–88 First Division	Goodison Park	1–0		Clarke	44,162	
162	21 February 1988	87–88 FA Cup Rnd 5	Goodison Park	0–1	Houghton		48,270	
161 (137)	1 November 1987	87–88 First Division	Anfield	2–0	McMahon, Beardsley		44,760	
160	28 October 1987	87–88 League Cup Rnd 3	Anfield	0–1		Stevens	44,071	
159 (136)	25 April 1987	86–87 First Division	Anfield	3–1	McMahon, Rush	Sheedy	44,827	
158	21 January 1987	86–87 League Cup Rnd 5	Goodison Park	0–1	Rush		53,323	
157 (135)	23 November 1986	86–87 First Division	Goodison Park	0–0			48,247	
156	30 September 1986	Super Cup Final 2nd leg	Goodison Park	1–4	Rush, Nicol	Sharp (pen.)	26,068	
155	16 September 1986	Super Cup Final 1st leg	Anfield	3–1	Rush, McMahon	Sheedy	20,660	
154	16 August 1986	1986 FA Charity Shield	Wembley	1–1	Rush	Heath	88,231	
153	10 May 1986	85–86 FA Cup Final	Wembley	3–1	Rush, Johnston	Lineker	98,000	
152 (134)	22 February 1986	85–86 First Division	Anfield	0–2		Ratcliffe, Lineker	45,445	
151 (133)	21 September 1985	85–86 First Division	Goodison Park	2–3	Dalglish, Rush, McMahon	Sharp, Lineker	51,509	
150 (132)	23 May 1985	84–85 First Division	Goodison Park	1–0		Wilkinson	51,045	
149 (131)	20 October 1984	84–85 First Division	Anfield	0–1		Sharp	45,545	
148	18 August 1984	1984 FA Charity Shield	Wembley	1–0		Grobbelaar (o.g.)	100,000	
147	28 March 1984	83–84 League Cup Final R.	Maine Road	1–0	Souness		52,089	
146	25 March 1984	83–84 League Cup Final	Wembley	0–0			100,000	
145 (130)	3 March 1984	83–84 First Division	Goodison Park	1–1	Rush	Harper	51,245	
144 (129)	6 November 1983	83–84 First Division	Anfield	3–0	Rush, Robinson, Nicol		40,875	
143 (128)	19 March 1983	82–83 First Division	Anfield	0–0			44,737	
142 (127)	6 November 1982	82–83 First Division	Goodison Park	0–5	Rush, Lawrenson	(red card) Keeley	52,741	
141 (126)	27 March 1982	81–82 First Division	Goodison Park	1–3	Whelan, Souness, Johnston	Sharp	51,847	
140 (125)	7 November 1981	81–82 First Division	Anfield	3–1	Dalglish, Rush	Ferguson – (red card) O'Keefe	48,861	
139 (124)	21 March 1981	80–81 First Division	Anfield	1–0	Bailey (o.g.)		49,743	
138	24 January 1981	80–81 FA Cup Rnd 4	Goodison Park	2–1	Case	Eastoe, Varadi	53,804	
137 (123)	18 October 1980	80–81 First Division	Goodison Park	2–2	Lee, Dalglish	Hartford, McBride	52,565	
136 (122)	1 March 1980	79–80 First Division	Goodison Park	1–2	Johnson, Neal (pen.)	Eastoe	53,018	
135 (121)	20 October 1979	79–80 First Division	Anfield	2–2	Lyons (o.g.), R. Kennedy – (red card) McDermott	Kidd, King – (red card) Stanley	52,201	
134 (120)	13 March 1979	78–79 First Division	Anfield	1–1	Dalglish	King	52,352	
133 (119)	28 October 1978	78–79 First Division	Goodison Park	1–0		King	53,141	
132 (118)	5 April 1978	77–78 First Division	Goodison Park	0–1	Johnson		52,759	
131 (117)	22 October 1977	77–78 First Division	Anfield	0–0			51,668	
130	27 April 1977	76–77 FA Cup Semi-final R.	Maine Road	3–0	Neal (pen.), Case, Kennedy		56,579	
129	23 April 1977	76–77 FA Cup Semi-final	Maine Road	2–2	McDermott, Case	Rioch, McKenzie	56,637	
128 (116)	22 March 1977	76–77 First Division	Goodison Park	0–0			56,562	
127 (115)	16 October 1976	76–77 First Division	Anfield	3–1	Heighway, Neal (pen.), Toshack	Dobson	55,141	
126 (114)	3 April 1976	75–76 First Division	Anfield	1–0	Fairclough		54,632	
125 (113)	27 September 1975	75–76 First Division	Goodison Park	0–0			55,769	
124 (112)	22 February 1975	74–75 First Division	Anfield	0–0			55,853	
123 (111)	16 November 1974	74–75 First Division	Goodison Park	0–0			57,190	
122 (110)	20 April 1974	73–74 First Division	Anfield	0–0			55,848	
121 (109)	8 December 1973	73–74 First Division	Goodison Park	0–1	Waddle		56,098	
120 (108)	3 March 1973	72–73 First Division	Goodison Park	0–2	Hughes		54,856	
119 (107)	7 October 1972	72–73 First Division	Anfield	1–0	Cormack		55,975	
118 (106)	4 March 1972	71–72 First Division	Anfield	4–0	Wright (o.g.), McLaughlin (o.g.), Lawler, Hughes		53,922	
117 (105)	13 November 1971	71–72 First Division	Goodison Park	1–0		Johnson	56,293	
116	27 March 1971	70–71 FA Cup Semi-final	Old Trafford	2–1	Evans, Hall	Ball	62,144	
115 (104)	20 February 1971	70–71 First Division	Goodison Park	0–0			56,846	
114 (103)	21 November 1970	70–71 First Division	Anfield	3–2	Heighway, Toshack, Lawler	Royle, Whittle	53,777	
113 (102)	21 March 1970	69–70 First Division	Anfield	0–2		Royle, Whittle	54,496	
112 (101)	6 December 1969	69–70 First Division	Goodison Park	0–3	Hughes, Brown (o.g.), Graham		57,370	
111 (100)	8 October 1968	68–69 First Division	Anfield	1–1	Smith	Ball	54,496	
110 (99)	27 August 1968	68–69 First Division	Goodison Park	0–0			63,938	
109 (98)	3 February 1968	67–68 First Division	Goodison Park	1–0		Kendall	64,482	
108 (97)	23 September 1967	67–68 First Division	Anfield	1–0	Hunt		54,189	
107	11 March 1967	66–67 FA Cup Rnd 5	Goodison Park	1–0		Ball	64,851	
106 (96)	31 December 1966	66–67 First Division	Anfield	0–0			53,744	
105 (95)	27 August 1966	66–67 First Division	Goodison Park	3–1	Smith	Ball, Brown	64,318	
104	13 August 1966	1966 FA Charity Shield	Goodison Park	0–1	Hunt		63,329	
103 (94)	19 March 1966	65–66 First Division	Goodison Park	0–0			62,337	
102 (93)	25 September 1965	65–66 First Division	Anfield	5–0	Smith, Hunt, Stevenson, St. John		53,557	
101 (92)	12 April 1965	64–65 First Division	Goodison Park	2–1	Stevenson (pen.)	Morrissey, Temple	65,402	
100 (91)	19 September 1964	64–65 First Division	Anfield	0–4		Harvey, Morrissey, Pickering, Temple	52,619	
99 (90)	8 February 1964	63–64 First Division	Goodison Park	3–1	St. John	Vernon, Gabriel	66,515	
98 (89)	28 September 1963	63–64 First Division	Anfield	2–1	Callaghan	Vernon	51,976	
97 (88)	8 April 1963	62–63 First Division	Anfield	0–0			56,060	
96 (87)	22 September 1962	62–63 First Division	Goodison Park	2–2	Lewis, Hunt	Morrissey, Vernon	72,488	
95	29 January 1955	54–55 FA Cup Rnd 4	Goodison Park	0–4	Liddell, A'Court, Evans		72,000	
There were no league derbies between 1951 and 1962. Everton were relegated in 1951 and were in the Football League Second Division for 3 seasons (1951–52 to 1953–54). Everton were promoted in 1953–54 (1953–54), whilst Liverpool were relegated to the Football League Second Division that same season. Liverpool were in the Football League Second Division for 8 seasons (1954–55 to 1961–62).
94 (86)	20 January 1951	50–51 First Division	Anfield	0–2		McIntosh	48,688	
93 (85)	16 September 1950	50–51 First Division	Goodison Park	1–3	Stubbins, Balmer	Eglington	71,150	
92	25 March 1950	49–50 FA Cup Semi-final	Maine Road	2–0	Paisley, Liddell		72,000	
91 (84)	24 December 1949	49–50 First Division	Anfield	3–1	Baron, Fagan	Farrell	50,485	
90 (83)	27 August 1949	49–50 First Division	Goodison Park	0–0			70,812	
89 (82)	5 February 1949	48–49 First Division	Anfield	0–0			50,132	
88 (81)	18 September 1948	48–49 First Division	Goodison Park	1–1	Fagan	Dodds	78,299	
87 (80)	21 April 1948	47–48 First Division	Anfield	4–0	Stubbins, Liddell, Brierley, Balmer		55,305	
86 (79)	27 September 1947	47–48 First Division	Goodison Park	0–3	Balmer, Stubbins, Fagan		66,776	
85 (78)	29 January 1947	46–47 First Division	Goodison Park	1–0		Wainwright	50,612	
84 (77)	21 September 1946	46–47 First Division	Anfield	0–0			48,875	
No competitive football was played between 1939 and 1946 due to World War II
83 (76)	4 February 1939	38–39 First Division	Anfield	0–3		Lawton, Bentham	55,994	
82 (75)	1 October 1938	38–39 First Division	Goodison Park	2–1	Fagan (pen.)	Bentham, Boyes	64,977	
81 (74)	16 February 1938	37–38 First Division	Goodison Park	1–3	Balmer, Shafto	Lawton	33,465	
80 (73)	2 October 1937	37–38 First Division	Anfield	1–2	Nieuwenhuys	Lawton, Trentham	43,904	
79 (72)	23 January 1937	36–37 First Division	Anfield	3–2	Howe, Taylor, Balmer	Stevenson	37,055	
78 (71)	19 September 1936	36–37 First Division	Goodison Park	2–0		Dean, Stevenson	55,835	
77 (70)	4 January 1936	35–36 First Division	Goodison Park	0–0			52,282	
76 (69)	7 September 1935	35–36 First Division	Anfield	6–0	Howe, Hodgson		46,082	
75 (68)	20 March 1935	34–35 First Division	Anfield	2–1	Hodgson (1 pen.)	Dean	31,965	
74 (67)	15 September 1934	34–35 First Division	Goodison Park	1–0		Dean	43,001	
73 (66)	10 February 1934	33–34 First Division	Goodison Park	0–0			52,088	
72 (65)	30 September 1933	33–34 First Division	Anfield	3–2	Nieuwenhuys, Hanson, English	Johnson, White	53,698	
71 (64)	11 February 1933	32–33 First Division	Anfield	7–4	Hanson, Barton, Morrison, Taylor, Roberts	Dean, Johnson, Stein	41,469	
70 (63)	1 October 1932	32–33 First Division	Goodison Park	3–1	Gunson	Dean, Critchley	44,214	
69 (62)	30 January 1932	31–32 First Division	Goodison Park	2–1	Wright	Critchley, White	46,537	
68	9 January 1932	31–32 FA Cup Rnd 3	Goodison Park	1–2	Gunson, Hodgson	Dean	57,090	
67 (61)	19 September 1931	31–32 First Division	Anfield	1–3	Wright	Dean	53,220	
1930–31 Everton were in the Football League Second Division
66 (60)	4 January 1930	29–30 First Division	Goodison Park	3–3	Edmed, McPherson, McDougall	Dean, Critchley	52,600	
65 (59)	7 September 1929	29–30 First Division	Anfield	0–3		Dean, Martin	44,891	
64 (58)	9 February 1929	28–29 First Division	Anfield	1–2	Race	Griffiths, White	45,095	
63 (57)	29 September 1928	28–29 First Division	Goodison Park	1–0		Troup	55,415	
62 (56)	25 February 1928	27–28 First Division	Anfield	3–3	Hopkin, Bromilow, Hodgson	Dean	55,361	
61 (55)	15 October 1927	27–28 First Division	Goodison Park	1–1	Edmed	Troup	65,729	
60 (54)	12 February 1927	26–27 First Division	Anfield	1–0	Chambers		52,840	
59 (53)	25 September 1926	26–27 First Division	Goodison Park	1–0		O'Donnell	43,973	
58 (52)	6 February 1926	25–26 First Division	Goodison Park	3–3	Oxley, Forshaw	Chedgzoy, Dean, Irvine	45,793	
57 (51)	26 September 1925	25–26 First Division	Anfield	5–1	Forshaw, Walsh, Chambers	Kennedy	49,426	
56 (50)	7 February 1925	24–25 First Division	Anfield	3–1	Shone, Hopkin, Chambers	Chadwick	56,000	
55 (49)	4 October 1924	24–25 First Division	Goodison Park	0–1	Rawlings		53,000	
54 (48)	13 October 1923	23–24 First Division	Anfield	1–2	Walsh	Cock, Chedgzoy	50,000	
53 (47)	6 October 1923	23–24 First Division	Goodison Park	1–0		Chadwick	51,000	
52 (46)	14 October 1922	22–23 First Division	Goodison Park	0–1	Johnson		52,000	
51 (45)	7 October 1922	22–23 First Division	Anfield	5–1	Chambers, McNab, Bromilow	Williams	54,000	
50 (44)	12 November 1921	21–22 First Division	Anfield	1–1	Forshaw	Chedgzoy	50,000	
49 (43)	5 November 1921	21–22 First Division	Goodison Park	1–1	Shone	Brewster	52,000	
48 (42)	30 October 1920	20–21 First Division	Goodison Park	0–3	Johnson, Chambers		55,000	
47 (41)	23 October 1920	20–21 First Division	Anfield	1–0	Forshaw		50,000	
46 (40)	27 December 1919	19–20 First Division	Anfield	1–3	Lewis, Miller	Parker	49,662	
45 (39)	20 December 1919	19–20 First Division	Goodison Park	0–0			40,000	
No competitive football was played between 1915 and 1919 due to World War I
44 (38)	6 February 1915	14–15 First Division	Goodison Park	1–3	Sheldon, Nicholl, Pagnam	Clennell	30,000	
43 (37)	3 October 1914	14–15 First Division	Anfield	0–5		Parker, Clennell	32,000	
42 (36)	17 January 1914	13–14 First Division	Anfield	1–2	Metcalf	Parker	35,000	
41 (35)	20 September 1913	13–14 First Division	Goodison Park	1–2	Lacey	Wareing	40,000	
40 (34)	8 February 1913	12–13 First Division	Goodison Park	0–2	Parkinson		40,000	
39 (33)	5 October 1912	12–13 First Division	Anfield	0–2		Browell, Gault	46,000	
38 (32)	20 January 1912	11–12 First Division	Anfield	1–3	Gilligan	Beare, Browell, Jefferis	35,000	
37 (31)	16 September 1911	11–12 First Division	Goodison Park	2–1	Parkinson	Beare, Gourlay	40,000	
36	4 February 1911	10–11 FA Cup Rnd 2	Goodison Park	2–1	Parkinson	Young	50,000	
35 (30)	27 December 1910	10–11 First Division	Goodison Park	0–1	Parkinson		51,000	
34 (29)	1 October 1910	10–11 First Division	Anfield	0–2		Makepeace, Young	40,000	
33 (28)	12 February 1910	09–10 First Division	Anfield	0–1		Freeman	40,000	
32 (27)	2 October 1909	09–10 First Division	Goodison Park	2–3	Goddard, Stewart, Parkinson	Coleman, Freeman	45,000	
31 (26)	9 April 1909	08–09 First Division	Goodison Park	5–0		Freeman, Coleman, Turner, White	45,000	
30 (25)	3 October 1908	08–09 First Division	Anfield	0–1		Barlow	40,000	
29 (24)	17 April 1908	07–08 First Division	Anfield	0–0			35,000	
28 (23)	5 October 1907	07–08 First Division	Goodison Park	2–4	J. Hewitt, Raisbeck, Cox, C. Hewitt	Makepeace, Settle	40,000	
27 (22)	29 March 1907	06–07 First Division	Goodison Park	0–0			45,000	
26 (21)	29 September 1906	06–07 First Division	Anfield	1–2	Parkinson	Young	40,000	
25 (20)	13 April 1906	05–06 First Division	Anfield	1–1	West (pen.)	Taylor	33,000	
24	31 March 1906	05–06 FA Cup Semi-final	Villa Park	2–0		Abbott, Hardman	37,000	
23 (19)	30 September 1905	05–06 First Division	Goodison Park	4–2	Hewitt	Abbott, Hardman, Settle, Sharp	40,000	
1904–05 Liverpool were in the Football League Second Division
22	8 February 1905	04–05 FA Cup Rnd 1 Rep.	Goodison Park	2–1	Goddard	Hardman, McDermott	40,000	
21	4 February 1905	04–05 FA Cup Rnd 1	Anfield	1–1	Parkinson	Makepeace	28,000	
20 (18)	1 April 1904	03–04 First Division	Goodison Park	5–2	Robinson, Cox	Young, Wolstenholme	40,000	
19 (17)	10 October 1903	03–04 First Division	Anfield	2–2	Morris	Sheridan	30,000	
18 (16)	10 April 1903	02–03 First Division	Anfield	0–0			28,000	
17 (15)	27 September 1902	02–03 First Division	Goodison Park	3–1	Raybould (pen.)	Abbott, Brearley, Young	40,000	
16	30 January 1902	01–02 FA Cup Rnd 1 Rep.	Goodison Park	0–2	Balmer (o.g.), Hunter		20,000	
15	25 January 1902	01–02 FA Cup Rnd 1	Anfield	2–2	Robertson, Hunter	Sharp, Young	25,000	
14 (14)	11 January 1902	01–02 First Division	Goodison Park	4–0		Settle, Bell, Young	25,000	
13 (13)	14 September 1901	01–02 First Division	Anfield	2–2	White, Raybould	Settle, Sharp	30,000	
12 (12)	19 January 1901	00–01 First Division	Anfield	1–2	Cox	Taylor	18,000	
11 (11)	22 September 1900	00–01 First Division	Goodison Park	1–1	Raybould	McDonald	50,000	
10 (10)	20 January 1900	99–00 First Division	Goodison Park	3–1	Raybould	Settle, Blythe	30,000	
9 (9)	23 September 1899	99–00 First Division	Anfield	1–2	Robertson	Settle, Taylor	30,000	
8 (8)	21 January 1899	98–99 First Division	Anfield	2–0	Walker, Robertson		30,000	
7 (7)	24 September 1898	98–99 First Division	Goodison Park	1–2	McCowie (1 pen.)	Proudfoot	45,000	
6 (6)	16 October 1897	97–98 First Division	Goodison Park	3–0		Williams, Bell	40,000	
5 (5)	25 September 1897	97–98 First Division	Anfield	3–1	Cunliffe, McQue, Becton	Taylor	30,000	
4 (4)	21 November 1896	96–97 First Division	Anfield	0–0			30,000	
3 (3)	3 October 1896	96–97 First Division	Goodison Park	2–1	Ross	Hartley, Milward	45,000	
1895–96 Liverpool were in the Football League Second Division
2 (2)	17 November 1894	94–95 First Division	Anfield	2–2	Hannah, Ross (pen.)	Kelso, Latta	30,000	
1 (1)	13 October 1894	94–95 First Division	Goodison Park	3–0		Bell, Latta, McInnes	44,000	

=== Testimonials ===
Date	Beneficiary	Venue	Score	Liverpool scorers	Everton scorers	Attendance	Ref.
4 September 2010	Jamie Carragher	Anfield	4–1	Luis García, Carragher, Cole, Eccleston	Carragher (o.g.)	35,631	
10 October 1992	Bruce Grobbelaar	Anfield	2–2	Burrows, Rosenthal	Beagrie, Barlow	20,516	
12 August 1985	Phil Neal	Anfield	2–3	Neal, Johnston	Heath Mountfield	23,480	
11 May 1981	Steve Heighway	Anfield	2–2	Johnson	Hickson (pen.) Latchford	17,137	
13 March 1973	Brian Labone	Goodison Park	2–1	Toshack	Lyons, Husband	25,779	

== See also ==
- List of association football rivalries in the United Kingdom
- Liverpool F.C.–Chelsea F.C. rivalry
- Liverpool F.C.–Manchester City F.C. rivalry
- Liverpool F.C.–Manchester United F.C. rivalry
