= Tony McNamara =

Tony McNamara may refer to:

- Tony McNamara (footballer) (1929–2015), English footballer
- Tony McNamara (writer) (born 1967), Australian writer for film and television
