= 1965–66 Everton F.C. season =

English football club season

Everton
1965–66 season
- Manager: Harry Catterick
- Ground: Goodison Park
- First Division: 11th
- FA Cup: Winners
- Inter-Cities Fairs Cup: Second Round
- Top goalscorer: League: Fred Pickering (18); All: Fred Pickering (22)
Home colours	Away colours

During the 1965–66 English football season, Everton F.C. competed in the Football League First Division.

== Final League Table ==
Pos	Team	Pld	W	D	L	GF	GA	GAv	Pts	Qualification or relegation
9	Sheffield United	42	16	11	15	56	59	0.949	43	
10	Stoke City	42	15	12	15	65	64	1.016	42	
11	Everton	42	15	11	16	56	62	0.903	41	Qualification for the European Cup Winners' Cup first round (Note: Everton qualified for the European Cup Winners' Cup as the 1965–66 FA Cup winners.)
12	West Ham United	42	15	9	18	70	83	0.843	39	
13	Blackpool	42	14	9	19	55	65	0.846	37	

Source: World Football
Rules for classification: 1) Points; 2) Goal average; 3) Goals scored

== Results ==
Win	Draw	Loss

=== Football League First Division ===
Date	Opponent	Venue	Result	Attendance	Scorers
21 August 1965	Northampton Town	H	5–2		
25 August 1965	Sheffield Wednesday	A	1–3		
28 August 1965	Stoke City	A	1–1		
31 August 1965	Sheffield Wednesday	H	5–1		
4 September 1965	Burnley	H	1–0		
7 September 1965	West Bromwich Albion	H	2–3		
11 September 1965	Chelsea	A	1–3		
15 September 1965	West Bromwich Albion	A	1–1		
18 September 1965	Arsenal	H	3–1		
25 September 1965	Liverpool	A	0–5		
5 October 1965	Blackburn Rovers	H	2–2		
9 October 1965	Tottenham Hotspur	H	3–1		
16 October 1965	Fulham	A	2–3		
23 October 1965	Blackpool	H	0–0		
30 October 1965	Blackburn Rovers	A	2–1		
6 November 1965	Leicester City	H	1–2		
13 November 1965	Sheffield United	A	0–2		
20 November 1965	Leeds United	H	0–0		
27 November 1965	West Ham United	A	0–3		
4 December 1965	Sunderland	H	2–0		
11 December 1965	Aston Villa	H	2–3		
15 December 1965	Manchester United	A	0–3		
18 December 1965	Fulham	H	2–0		
27 December 1965	Nottingham Forest	A	0–1		
1 January 1966	Tottenham Hotspur	A	2–2		
8 January 1966	Aston Villa	H	2–0		
11 January 1966	West Ham United	H	2–2		
15 January 1966	Blackpool	A	0–2		
29 January 1966	Northampton Town	A	2–0		
5 February 1966	Stoke City	H	2–1		
19 February 1966	Burnley	A	1–1		
26 February 1966	Chelsea	H	2–1		
12 March 1966	Arsenal	A	1–0		
15 March 1966	Nottingham Forest	H	3–0		
19 March 1966	Liverpool	H	0–0		
8 April 1966	Newcastle United	A	0–0		
9 April 1966	Sheffield United	H	1–3		
11 April 1966	Newcastle United	H	1–0		
16 April 1966	Leeds United	A	1–4		
25 April 1966	Manchester United	H	0–0		
30 April 1966	Sunderland	A	0–2		
4 May 1966	Leicester City	A	0–3		

=== FA Cup ===
Round	Date	Opponent	Venue	Result	Attendance	Goalscorers
3	22 January 1966	Sunderland	H	3–0		
4	12 February 1966	Bedford Town	A	3–0		
5	5 March 1966	Coventry City	H	3–0		
6	26 March 1966	Manchester City	A	0–0		
6:R	29 March 1966	Manchester City	H	0–0		
6:2R	5 April 1966	Manchester City	N	2–0		
SF	23 April 1966	Manchester United	N	1–0		Harvey
F	14 May 1966	Sheffield Wednesday	N	3–2	100,000	Trebilcock (2), Temple

=== Inter-Cities Fairs Cup ===
Round	Date	Opponent	Venue	Result	Attendance	Goalscorers
1:1	28 September 1965	(West Germany) FC Nürnberg	A	1–1		
1:2	12 October 1965	(West Germany) FC Nürnberg	H	1–0		
2:1	3 November 1965	(Hungary) Újpest Dózsa	A	0–3		
2:2	16 November 1965	(Hungary) Újpest Dózsa	H	2–1		
