= 1964–65 Everton F.C. season =

English football club season

Everton
1964–65 season
- Manager: Harry Catterick
- Ground: Goodison Park
- First Division: 4th
- FA Cup: Fourth Round
- Inter-Cities Fairs Cup: Third Round
- Top goalscorer: League: Fred Pickering (27); All: Fred Pickering (37)

During the 1964–65 English football season, Everton F.C. competed in the Football League First Division.

== Final league table ==
Pos	Team	Pld	W	D	L	GF	GA	GAv	Pts	Qualification or relegation
2	Leeds United	42	26	9	7	83	52	1.596	61	Qualification for the Inter-Cities Fairs Cup first round
3	Chelsea	42	24	8	10	89	54	1.648	56	Qualification for the Inter-Cities Fairs Cup first round
4	Everton	42	17	15	10	69	60	1.150	49	Qualification for the Inter-Cities Fairs Cup first round
5	Nottingham Forest	42	17	13	12	71	67	1.060	47	
6	Tottenham Hotspur	42	19	7	16	87	71	1.225	45	

Source: World Football
Rules for classification: 1) Points; 2) Goal average; 3) Goals scored

== Results ==
Win	Draw	Loss

=== Football League First Division ===
Date	Opponent	Venue	Result	Attendance	Scorers
22 August 1964	Stoke City	A	2–0		
25 August 1964	Nottingham Forest	H	1–0		
29 August 1964	Tottenham Hotspur	H	4–1		
1 September 1964	Nottingham Forest	A	1–3		
5 September 1964	Burnley	A	1–1		
8 September 1964	Manchester United	H	3–3		
12 September 1964	Sheffield United	H	1–1		
16 September 1964	Manchester United	A	1–2		
19 September 1964	Liverpool	A	4–0		
26 September 1964	Birmingham City	A	5–3		
3 October 1964	West Ham United	H	1–1		
5 October 1964	Aston Villa	A	2–1		
10 October 1964	Sheffield Wednesday	H	1–1		
17 October 1964	Blackpool	A	1–1		
24 October 1964	Blackburn Rovers	H	2–3		
31 October 1964	Arsenal	A	1–3		
7 November 1964	Leeds United	H	0–0		
14 November 1964	Chelsea	A	1–5		
21 November 1964	Leicester City	H	2–2		
28 November 1964	Sunderland	A	0–4		
5 December 1964	Wolverhampton Wanderers	H	5–0		
12 December 1964	Stoke City	H	1–1		
19 December 1964	Tottenham Hotspur	A	2–2		
26 December 1964	West Bromwich Albion	H	3–2		
2 January 1965	Burnley	H	2–1		
16 January 1965	Sheffield United	A	0–0		
6 February 1965	Birmingham City	H	1–1		
13 February 1965	West Ham United	A	1–0		
20 February 1965	Sheffield Wednesday	A	1–0		
27 February 1965	Blackpool	H	0–0		
6 March 1965	Blackburn Rovers	A	2–0		
13 March 1965	Aston Villa	H	3–1		
20 March 1965	Leeds United	A	1–4		
23 March 1965	West Bromwich Albion	A	0–4		
31 March 1965	Chelsea	H	1–1		
3 April 1965	Leicester City	A	1–2		
10 April 1965	Sunderland	H	1–1		
12 April 1965	Liverpool	H	2–1		
16 April 1965	Fulham	H	2–0		
17 April 1965	Wolverhampton Wanderers	A	4–2		
19 April 1965	Fulham	A	1–1		
24 April 1965	Arsenal	H	1–0		

=== FA Cup ===
Round	Date	Opponent	Venue	Result	Attendance	Goalscorers
3	9 January 1965	Sheffield Wednesday	H	2–2		
3:R	13 January 1965	Sheffield Wednesday	A	3–0		
4	30 January 1965	Leeds United	H	1–1		
4:R	2 February 1965	Leeds United	A	1–2		

=== Inter-Cities Fairs Cup ===
Round	Date	Opponent	Venue	Result	Attendance	Goalscorers
1:1	23 September 1964	(Norway) Vålerenga	A	5–2		
1:2	14 October 1964	(Norway) Vålerenga	H	4–2		
2:1	11 November 1964	(Scotland) Kilmarnock	A	2–0		
2:2	23 November 1964	(Scotland) Kilmarnock	H	4–1		
3:1	20 January 1965	(England) Manchester United	A	1–1		
3:2	9 February 1965	(England) Manchester United	H	1–2		
