= 1966–67 Everton F.C. season =

English football club season

Everton
1966–67 season
- Manager: Harry Catterick
- Ground: Goodison Park
- First Division: 6th
- FA Cup: Sixth Round
- European Cup Winners' Cup: Second Round
- FA Charity Shield: Runners-up
- Top goalscorer: League: Alan Ball (15); All: Alan Ball (18)
Home colours	Away colours

During the 1966–67 English football season, Everton F.C. competed in the Football League First Division.

== Final league table ==
Pos	Team	Pld	W	D	L	GF	GA	GAv	Pts	Qualification or relegation
4	Leeds United	42	22	11	9	62	42	1.476	55	Qualification for the Inter-Cities Fairs Cup first round
5	Liverpool	42	19	13	10	64	47	1.362	51	Qualification for the Inter-Cities Fairs Cup first round
6	Everton	42	19	10	13	65	46	1.413	48	
7	Arsenal	42	16	14	12	58	47	1.234	46	
8	Leicester City	42	18	8	16	78	71	1.099	44	

Source: World Football
Rules for classification: 1) Points; 2) Goal average; 3) Goals scored

== Results ==
Win	Draw	Loss

=== Charity Shield ===
Date	Opponent	Venue	Result	Attendance	Scorers
13 August 1966	Liverpool	H	0–1	63,329	

=== Football League First Division ===
Date	Opponent	Venue	Result	Attendance	Scorers
20 August 1966	Fulham	A	1–0		
23 August 1966	Manchester United	H	1–2		
27 August 1966	Liverpool	H	3–1		
31 August 1966	Manchester United	A	0–3		
3 September 1966	Stoke City	H	0–1		
6 September 1966	Burnley	H	1–1		
10 September 1966	Sheffield United	A	0–0		
17 September 1966	West Bromwich Albion	H	5–4		
24 September 1966	Leeds United	A	1–1		
1 October 1966	Newcastle United	H	1–1		
8 October 1966	West Ham United	A	3–2		
15 October 1966	Sheffield Wednesday	H	2–1		
25 October 1966	Southampton	A	3–1		
29 October 1966	Leicester City	H	2–0		
5 November 1966	Sheffield Wednesday	A	2–1		
12 November 1966	Arsenal	H	0–0		
19 November 1966	Manchester City	A	0–1		
26 November 1966	Blackpool	H	0–1		
3 December 1966	Chelsea	A	1–1		
17 December 1966	Fulham	H	3–2		
23 December 1966	Nottingham Forest	H	0–1		
26 December 1966	Nottingham Forest	A	0–1		
31 December 1966	Liverpool	A	0–0		
7 January 1967	Stoke City	A	1–2		
14 January 1967	Sheffield United	H	4–1		
21 January 1967	West Bromwich Albion	A	0–1		
4 February 1967	Leeds United	H	2–0		
11 February 1967	Newcastle United	A	3–0		
25 February 1967	West Ham United	H	4–0		
4 March 1967	Leicester City	A	2–2		
18 March 1967	Southampton	H	0–1		
22 March 1967	Tottenham Hotspur	H	0–1		
25 March 1967	Sunderland	A	2–0		
27 March 1967	Tottenham Hotspur	A	0–2		
1 April 1967	Aston Villa	H	3–1		
19 April 1967	Chelsea	H	2–1		
22 April 1967	Blackpool	A	1–0		
25 April 1967	Everton	A	1–3		
29 April 1967	Manchester City	H	1–1		
6 May 1967	Aston Villa	A	4–2		
13 May 1967	Burnley	A	1–1		
16 May 1967	Sunderland	H	4–1		

=== FA Cup ===
Round	Date	Opponent	Venue	Result	Attendance	Goalscorers
3	28 January 1967	Burnley	A	0–0		
3:R	31 January 1967	Burnley	H	2–1		
4	18 February 1967	Wolverhampton Wanderers	A	1–1		
4:R	21 February 1967	Wolverhampton Wanderers	H	3–1		
5	11 March 1967	Liverpool	H	1–0		
6	8 April 1967	Nottingham Forest	A	2–3		

=== European Cup Winners' Cup ===
Round	Date	Opponent	Venue	Result	Attendance	Goalscorers
1:1	28 September 1966	(Denmark) AaB Aalborg	A	0–0		
1:2	11 October 1966	(Denmark) AaB Aalborg	H	2–1		
2:1	9 November 1966	(Spain) Real Zaragoza	A	0–2		
2:2	23 November 1966	(Spain) Real Zaragoza	H	1–0		
