= John Proudfoot (footballer) =

Scottish footballer

Personal information
- Full name: John Proudfoot
- Date of birth: 27 February 1874
- Place of birth: Airdrie, Scotland
- Date of death: 22 April 1934 (aged 60)
- Place of death: Glasgow, Scotland
- Height: 5 ft 6 in (1.68 m)
- Position: Centre forward

Senior career*
Years	Team	Apps	(Gls)
1894–1896	Partick Thistle	35	(25)
1896–1898	Blackburn Rovers	36	(14)
1898–1902	Everton	84	(30)
1902–1903	Watford	12	(5)
1903–1904	Partick Thistle	17	(5)
1904–1905	Hamilton Academical	13	(10)
Total		197	(89)
- * Club domestic league appearances and goals

John Proudfoot (27 February 1874 – 22 April 1934) was a Scottish footballer who played in the Football League for Blackburn Rovers and Everton.

He began his career with Partick Thistle and returned there for a season after seven years in England; four of his brothers also played for the team, with David being the most prominent.
