= Billy Kirsopp =

English footballer

Personal information
- Full name: William Henry James Kirsopp
- Date of birth: 21 April 1892
- Place of birth: Liverpool, England
- Date of death: 21 April 1978 (aged 86)
- Place of death: Liverpool, England
- Height: 5 ft 8 in (1.73 m)
- Position: Inside right

Senior career*
Years	Team	Apps	(Gls)
- Wallasey Borough
1914–1921	Everton	58	(28)
1921–1922	Bury	20	(1)
1922–1923	Grimsby Town	6	(2)
1923–1924	New Brighton	14	(1)
1924	Crystal Palace	0	(0)
1924	Oswestry Town		
- Llandudno
- * Club domestic league appearances and goals

William Henry James Kirsopp (21 April 1892 – 21 April 1978) was an English professional footballer who played in the Football League for Everton, Bury, New Brighton and Grimsby Town as an inside right.

== Personal life ==
Kirsopp worked as a dock labourer for Cunard Line in Liverpool. In February 1916, 18 months after Britain's entry into the First World War, Kirsopp enlisted for short service in the Scots Guards Reserve. He was mobilised in January 1917 and posted to the Western Front in February 1918, where he was promoted to lance corporal. He was twice wounded in fighting during the Second Battle of the Somme in April 1918, with one of the wounds requiring the amputation of the first finger on his left hand. In February 1919, three months after the armistice, Kirsopp went AWOL from the army for seven weeks and on his return, he was sentenced to 55 days' detention at Wellington Barracks, which was reduced by 9 days following good behaviour. He was discharged from the army in October 1919 and married in 1920. He was buried in an unmarked grave in Allerton Cemetery.

== Honours ==
Everton

- Football League First Division: 1914–15
- Birkenhead Borough Hospital Cup: 1914–15

== Career statistics ==
Appearances and goals by club, season and competition
Club	Season	League			FA Cup		Total	
Club	Season	Division	Apps	Goals	Apps	Goals	Apps	Goals
Everton	1914–15	First Division	16	9	5	1	21	10
Everton	1919–20	First Division	29	14	0	0	29	14
Everton	1920–21	First Division	13	5	0	0	13	5
Career total			58	28	5	1	63	29
