= 1949–50 Everton F.C. season =

English football club season

Everton
1949–50 season
- Manager: Cliff Britton
- Ground: Goodison Park
- First Division: 18th
- FA Cup: Semi-Final
- Top goalscorer: League: Eddie Wainwright (11); All: Eddie Wainwright (13)
Home colours

During the 1949–50 English football season, Everton F.C. competed in the Football League First Division.

== Final league table ==
Pos	Team	Pld	W	D	L	GF	GA	GAv	Pts
16	Bolton Wanderers	42	10	14	18	45	59	0.763	34
17	Fulham	42	10	14	18	41	54	0.759	34
18	Everton	42	10	14	18	42	66	0.636	34
19	Stoke City	42	11	12	19	45	75	0.600	34
20	Charlton Athletic	42	13	6	23	53	65	0.815	32

Source: World Football
Rules for classification: 1) Points; 2) Goal average; 3) Goals scored

== Results ==
Win	Draw	Loss

=== Football League First Division ===
Date	Opponent	Venue	Result	Attendance	Scorers
20 August 1949	Middlesbrough	A	1–0		
24 August 1949	Newcastle United	H	2–1		
27 August 1949	Liverpool	H	0–0		
31 August 1949	Newcastle United	A	0–4		
3 September 1949	Huddersfield Town	H	3–0		
7 September 1949	Manchester City	A	0–0		
10 September 1949	Portsmouth	A	0–7		
17 September 1949	Wolverhamptoin Wanderers	H	1–2		
24 September 1949	Aston Villa	A	2–2		
1 October 1949	Charlton Athletic	H	0–1		
8 October 1949	Arsenal	A	2–5		
15 October 1949	Bolton Wanderers	H	0–0		
22 October 1949	Birmingham City	A	0–0		
29 October 1949	Derby County	H	1–2		
5 November 1949	West Bromwich Albion	A	0–4		
12 November 1949	Manchester United	H	0–0		
19 November 1949	Chelsea	A	2–3		
26 November 1949	Stoke City	H	2–1		
3 December 1949	Burnley	A	1–5		
10 December 1949	Sunderland	H	0–2		
17 December 1949	Middlesbrough	H	3–1		
24 December 1949	Liverpool	A	1–3		
26 December 1949	Fulham	H	1–1		
27 December 1949	Fulham	A	0–0		
31 December 1949	Huddersfield Town	A	2–1		
14 January 1950	Portsmouth	H	1–2		
21 January 1950	Wolverhampton Wanderers	A	1–1		
4 February 1950	Aston Villa	H	1–1		
18 February 1950	Charlton Athletic	A	0–2		
25 February 1950	Arsenal	H	0–1		
8 March 1950	Bolton Wanderers	H	2–1		
11 March 1950	Chelsea	H	1–1		
18 March 1950	Stoke City	A	0–1		
29 March 1950	West Bromwich Albion	H	1–2		
1 April 1950	Manchester United	A	1–1		
7 April 1950	Blackpool	H	3–0		
8 April 1950	Birmingham City	H	0–0		
10 April 1950	Blackpool	A	1–0		
15 April 1950	Derby County	A	0–2		
22 April 1950	Burnley	H	1–1		
29 April 1950	Sunderland	A	2–4		
6 May 1950	Manchester City	H	3–1		

=== FA Cup ===
Round	Date	Opponent	Venue	Result	Attendance	Goalscorers
3	7 January 1950	Queen's Park Rangers	A	2–0		
4	28 January 1950	West Ham United	A	2–1		
5	11 February 1950	Tottenham Hotspur	H	1–0		
6	4 March 1950	Derby County	A	2–1		
SF	25 March 1950	Liverpool	N	0–2		
