= 1967–68 Everton F.C. season =

English football club season

Everton
1967–68 season
- Manager: Harry Catterick
- Ground: Goodison Park
- First Division: 5th
- FA Cup: Runners-up
- League Cup: Third Round
- Top goalscorer: League: Alan Ball (20); All: Alan Ball, Joe Royle (20)
Home colours

During the 1967–68 English football season, Everton F.C. competed in the Football League First Division.

== Final league table ==
Pos	Team	Pld	W	D	L	GF	GA	GAv	Pts	Qualification or relegation
3	Liverpool	42	22	11	9	71	40	1.775	55	Qualification for the Inter-Cities Fairs Cup first round
4	Leeds United	42	22	9	11	71	41	1.732	53	Qualification for the Inter-Cities Fairs Cup first round
5	Everton	42	23	6	13	67	40	1.675	52	
6	Chelsea	42	18	12	12	62	68	0.912	48	Qualification for the Inter-Cities Fairs Cup first round (Note: Everton were ineligible to participate in the Inter-Cities Fairs Cup as Liverpool had already qualified. Under the rules of the cup, only one team per city could participate. Chelsea took their place as the highest-ranked team that hadn't already qualified for a European competition.)
7	Tottenham Hotspur	42	19	9	14	70	59	1.186	47	

Source: World Football
Rules for classification: 1) Points; 2) Goal average; 3) Goals scored

== Results ==
Win	Draw	Loss

=== Football League First Division ===
Date	Opponent	Venue	Result	Attendance	Scorers
19 August 1967	Manchester United	H	3–1		
23 August 1967	Tottenham Hotspur	A	1–1		
26 August 1967	Sunderland	A	0–1		
29 August 1967	Tottenham Hotspur	H	0–1		
2 September 1967	Wolverhampton Wanderers	H	4–2		
5 September 1967	West Ham United	H	2–0		
9 September 1967	Fulham	A	1–2		
16 September 1967	Leeds United	H	0–1		
23 September 1967	Liverpool	A	0–1		
30 September 1967	Leicester City	A	2–0		
7 October 1967	Southampton	H	4–2		
14 October 1967	Chelsea	A	1–1		
24 October 1967	West Bromwich Albion	H	2–1		
28 October 1967	Newcastle United	A	0–1		
4 November 1967	Manchester City	H	1–1		
11 November 1967	Arsenal	H	2–2		
18 November 1967	Sheffield United	H	1–0		
25 November 1967	Coventry City	A	2–0		
2 December 1967	Nottingham Forest	H	1–0		
9 December 1967	Stoke City	A	0–1		
16 December 1967	Manchester United	A	1–3		
23 December 1967	Sunderland	H	3–0		
26 December 1967	Burnley	H	2–0		
30 December 1967	Burnley	A	1–2		
6 January 1968	Wolverhampton Wanderers	A	3–1		
20 January 1968	Leeds United	A	0–2		
3 February 1968	Liverpool	H	1–0		
26 February 1968	Southampton	A	2–3		
2 March 1968	Coventry City	H	3–1		
16 March 1968	West Bromwich Albion	A	6–2		
23 March 1968	Newcastle United	H	1–0		
6 April 1968	Arsenal	H	2–0		
9 April 1968	Leicester City	H	2–1		
13 April 1968	Sheffield United	A	1–0		
15 April 1968	Sheffield Wednesday	H	1–0		
16 April 1968	Sheffield Wednesday	A	0–0		
20 April 1968	Chelsea	H	2–1		
22 April 1968	Nottingham Forest	A	0–1		
29 April 1968	Manchester City	A	0–2		
4 May 1968	Stoke City	H	3–0		
11 May 1968	West Ham United	A	1–1		
21 May 1968	Fulham	H	5–1		

=== FA Cup ===
Round	Date	Opponent	Venue	Result	Attendance	Goalscorers
3	27 January 1969	Southport	A	1–0	18,795	
4	17 February 1968	Carlisle United	A	2–0	25,000	
5	9 March 1968	Tranmere Rovers	H	2–0	61,982	
6	30 March 1968	Leicester City	A	3–1	43,519	Husband (2), Kendall
SF	27 April 1968	Leeds United	N	1–0	63,000	Morrissey (pen)
F	18 May 1968	West Bromwich Albion	N	0–1	100,000	

=== League Cup ===
Round	Date	Opponent	Venue	Result	Attendance	Goalscorers
2	13 September 1967	Bristol City	A	5–0		
3	11 October 1967	Sunderland	H	2–3		
