= Alex Young (footballer, born 1880) =

Scottish footballer (1880–1959)

Sandy Young
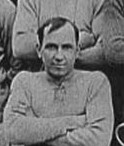

Personal information
- Full name: Alexander Simpson Young
- Date of birth: 23 June 1880
- Place of birth: Slamannan, Scotland
- Date of death: 17 September 1959 (aged 79)
- Place of death: Edinburgh, Scotland
- Height: 1.74 m (5 ft 8 1/2 in)
- Position: Inside right

Youth career
- 1898–1899: Slamannan Juniors

Senior career*
| Years | Team | Apps | (Gls) |
| 1899–1900 | St Mirren | 17 | (6) |
| 1900–1901 | Falkirk | 19 | (11) |
| 1901–1911 | Everton | 275 | (109) |
| 1911 | Tottenham Hotspur | 5 | (3) |
| 1911–1912 | Manchester City | 13 | (2) |
| ?–? | South Liverpool | ? | (?) |
| Total | | 329 | (133) |

International career
| 1905–1907 | Scotland | 2 | (0) |
- * Club domestic league appearances and goals

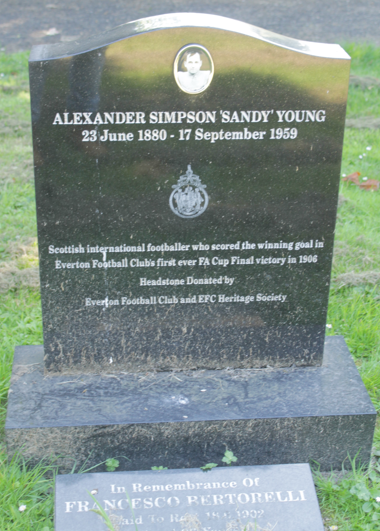
The grave of Alex Young, Seafield Cemetery

Alexander Simpson Young (23 June 1880 – 17 September 1959) was a Scottish professional footballer who played for St Mirren, Falkirk, Everton, Tottenham Hotspur, Manchester City, South Liverpool and represented Scotland at international level.

== Football career ==
He is the all-time fourth highest scorer for English club Everton and scored the only goal to win the 1906 FA Cup Final. Some attribute to him a total of 110 league goals for Everton, which would put him in second spot behind Dixie Dean. He was also the Football League's top scorer in 1906–07.

In 1911 he moved South to London and joined Tottenham Hotspur. Young scored on his Lilywhites debut in a 2-2 draw against his old club Everton at Goodison Park in September 1911 in the old First Division. Alex would score three goals in five appearances for the Spurs.

After leaving White Hart Lane, Young went on to play for Manchester City before ending his playing career at South Liverpool.

== Post-playing life ==
Young was convicted of the manslaughter of his brother in Australia in June 1916 and sentenced to three years' imprisonment. At times it was rumoured that he was hanged for sheep-rustling in Australia. Young, who was considered mentally unstable, died in an Edinburgh asylum on 17 September 1959 and is buried in Seafield Cemetery between Leith and Portobello. Everton FC, which supported Young throughout his life with occasional cash assistance, unveiled a new headstone in Edinburgh's Seafield cemetery on 3 September 2014. Everton Heritage Society chairman Paul Wharton said at the ceremony: "This is an Everton legend from 100 years ago that Evertonians will talk about in another 100 years. We had to honour the man and we're made up with how well it's gone. The Club are proud and so are we."

== Honours ==
Everton

- FA Cup: 1906
  - Runner-up: 1907

== Sources ==
- Alex "Sandy" Young at Stats section of Everton F.C. website
- FA Cup hero and man of mystery from the Liverpool Echo.
- Young's trial and conviction from the Melbourne Argus
- Everton FC minute-book text of telegram sent to Everton FC that reports Young's conviction.
- David Prentice: Sandy Young goes ahead of Graeme Sharp in the Everton FC all-time League goalscoring table – 100 years on, Liverpool Echo, 2013-01-23.
- Simon Burnton: The forgotten story of … Alex 'Sandy' Young, The Guardian, 2013-10-08.
