= Bobby Parker (footballer, born 1891) =

Scottish footballer and manager

Personal information
- Full name: Robert Norris Parker
- Date of birth: 27 March 1891
- Place of birth: Glasgow, Scotland
- Date of death: 1950 (aged 58–59)
- Place of death: Liverpool, England
- Height: 5 ft 8 in (1.73 m)
- Position: Centre forward

Senior career*
Years	Team	Apps	(Gls)
–1910	Ashfield		
1910–1913	Rangers	17	(17)
1913–1921	Everton	84	(68)
1916–1917	→ Rangers (loan)	1	(0)
1917	→ Morton (loan)	18	(9)
1921–1923	Nottingham Forest		
1923–1925	Fraserburgh		

Managerial career
- 1925–1926: Fraserburgh
- 1926–1933: Bohemians
- * Club domestic league appearances and goals

Robert Norris Parker (27 March 1891 – 1950) was a Scottish professional footballer whose position was centre forward.

He played professionally in Scotland with Rangers and Morton and in England with Everton and Nottingham Forest during a career interrupted by World War I, in which he was seriously injured. He later served as manager of Fraserburgh in Scotland and Bohemians in Ireland.

== Playing career ==
Born in Glasgow, Parker started his career with Junior team Ashfield, followed by three seasons at Rangers, during which he had a scoring record of a goal every game but was always a backup to the equally prolific Willie Reid; Rangers won the Scottish Football League title in each of those years, but it is unclear if Parker was awarded any medals, having only featured in 2, 3 and 9 of the fixtures respectively.

With the situation unchanged at the beginning of a fourth campaign, he moved to England to play for Everton in 1913 for a fee of £1,500. He finished as the top goalscorer for the Toffees in the 1913–14 and 1914–15 seasons, the latter of which he was the top goalscorer overall in the First Division while Everton was crowned champion.

The First World War then interrupted Parker's career and ultimately robbed him of cementing a place amongst Everton's greats as he returned home from the conflict with a bullet lodged in his back. The injury made him a shadow of his former self, and he was later sold to Nottingham Forest.

== Coaching career ==
In retirement, he worked as manager of Irish club Bohemians, where he coached them to the Clean Sweep in 1927–28, winning the League of Ireland, FAI Cup, Shield, and Leinster Senior Cup.

== Personal life ==
Parker was a private in the Royal Scots Fusiliers and Labour Corps during the First World War.

== Honours ==
Everton

- Football League First Division: 1914–15

Bohemian

- League of Ireland: 1927–28
- FAI Cup: 1927–28
- League of Ireland Shield: 1927–28
- Leinster Senior Cup: 1927–28
