= Tony McNamara (footballer) =

English footballer (1929–2015)

Personal information
- Full name: Anthony McNamara
- Date of birth: 3 October 1929
- Place of birth: Liverpool, England
- Date of death: 30 May 2015 (aged 85)
- Place of death: Liverpool, England
- Position: Winger

Senior career*
Years	Team	Apps	(Gls)
1947–1957	Everton	113	(22)
1957–1958	Liverpool	10	(3)
1958	Crewe Alexandra	9	(2)
1958–1959	Bury	14	(0)
1959–1960	Runcorn		
- * Club domestic league appearances and goals

Tony McNamara (3 October 1929 – 30 May 2015) was an English footballer who played as a winger. He would become the first football player to play in all four divisions in England within the space of 12 months, as he played for Crewe Alexandra and then Bury.

== Death ==
NcNamara died on 30 May 2015 after struggling with a long illness in Liverpool, aged 85.
