= Fred Pickering =

English footballer (1941–2019)

Personal information
- Full name: Frederick Pickering
- Date of birth: 19 January 1941
- Place of birth: Blackburn, England
- Date of death: 9 February 2019 (aged 78)
- Place of death: Lancashire, England
- Height: 5 ft 11 in (1.80 m)
- Position: Forward

Senior career*
Years	Team	Apps	(Gls)
1959–1964	Blackburn Rovers	123	(59)
1964–1967	Everton	97	(56)
1967–1969	Birmingham City	74	(27)
1969–1971	Blackpool	49	(24)
1971–1972	Blackburn Rovers	11	(2)
1972	Brighton & Hove Albion	0	(0)
Total		354	(168)

International career
1964	England	3	(5)
- * Club domestic league appearances and goals

Frederick Pickering (19 January 1941 – 9 February 2019) was an English professional footballer who played as a forward.

== Club career ==
Pickering began his career with his hometown club, Blackburn Rovers, in 1959, signing professional forms on his 17th birthday. He signed for Everton for £80,000 in 1964 but missed the 1966 FA Cup final, his replacement Mike Trebilcock scoring twice in a 3-2 win over Sheffield Wednesday

== International career ==
Pickering won three caps and scored five goals for England in 1964 during his Everton career. He made his international debut on 27 May 1964, against the United States, and scored a hat-trick in a 10–0 victory for Alf Ramsey's team.
