= Jimmy O'Neill (footballer, born 1931) =

Irish footballer

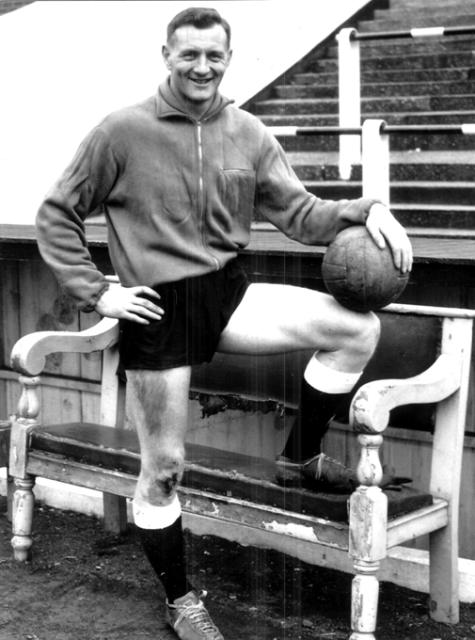

Personal information
- Full name: James Anthony O'Neill
- Date of birth: 13 October 1931
- Place of birth: Dublin, Ireland
- Date of death: 15 December 2007 (aged 76)
- Place of death: Ormskirk, England
- Height: 5 ft 10 in (1.78 m)
- Position: Goalkeeper

Youth career
- Bulfin United

Senior career*
Years	Team	Apps	(Gls)
1949–1960	Everton	201	(0)
1960–1964	Stoke City	130	(0)
1964–1965	Darlington	32	(0)
1965–1966	Port Vale	42	(0)
1966–1967	→ Cork Celtic (loan)	16	(0)
1967–1968	Cork Celtic	2	(0)
Total		423	(0)

International career
1952–1959	Republic of Ireland	17	(0)
- * Club domestic league appearances and goals

James Anthony O'Neill (13 October 1931 – 15 December 2007) was an Irish international football goalkeeper. He played 405 league games in a 17-year career in the Football League, and also won 17 caps for the Republic of Ireland. Though only 5 ft 10 in (1.78 m), he was able to use his acrobatic ability to save the ball.

He spent the whole of the 1950s with Everton, helping the "Toffees" to win promotion out of the Second Division in 1953–54. He was sold to Stoke City for £5,000 in July 1960 and helped the "Potters" to top the Second Division table in 1962–63. He moved on to Darlington in March 1964 before signing with Port Vale in February 1965. He was loaned out to Cork Celtic in December 1966 before being allowed to join the club permanently on a free transfer in May 1967. He retired the following year and later ran a taxi firm in Ormskirk.

== Club career ==
Dublin-born O'Neill played junior football in Ireland for Bulfin United and was an Irish schoolboy international. He was spotted in a youth international match in Brentford by Everton and signed as a professional with the club in May 1949, the "Toffees" seeing him as a potential replacement for 39-year-old Ted Sagar. He made his début as an 18-year-old against Middlesbrough in August 1950. Everton were relegated out of the First Division in 1950–51. They finished seven points short of promotion in 1951–52, before dropping to 16th in 1952–53, just five points above relegation. O'Neill played in the 1953 FA Cup semi-final against Bolton Wanderers and shared the goalkeeping duties with Harry Leyland during the promotion campaign of 1953–54, as Cliff Britton led the club to a second-place finish, behind champions Leicester City on goal average but ahead of Blackburn Rovers by a single point. Everton then finished 11th in the top-flight in 1954–55, and 15th in 1955–56. New boss Ian Buchan led the club to 15th in 1956–57 and 16th in 1957–58. O'Neill did not get along with the new manager Johnny Carey and became unsettled. He remained though for further mid-table campaigns in 1958–59 and 1959–60, and played a total of 213 league and cup games during his time at Goodison Park.

He joined Tony Waddington's Stoke City for £5,000 in July 1960. He played 47 games in 1960–61, as the club struggled in Second Division, He played 46 games in 1961–62, as Stoke were boosted by the return of the legendary Stanley Matthews. O'Neill was an ever-present in the 45 match 1962–63 season, as the "Potters" won the Second Division championship. However, in 1963–64 Waddington placed his faith in the new signings of Bobby Irvine and Lawrie Leslie and O'Neill, the eldest of the three, was now the third-choice keeper. Unable to accept this arrangement he moved on to Fourth Division club Darlington in March 1964. He had made 149 league and cup appearances in four years at the Victoria Ground. Darlington finished one point above the re-election zone in 1963–64, and again struggled in 1964–65. He made 32 league appearances during his eleven months at Feethams.

In February 1965, he moved on to Port Vale, who were then managed by Jackie Mudie. He was preferred ahead of Ken Hancock and Reg Davies, and played 13 games of the 1964–65 season, as the "Valiants" were relegated out of the Third Division. He played 35 games in 1965–66. He lost his place to new signing Stuart Sharratt in March.

In December 1966, he was loaned out to Cork Celtic back in his home country and made his League of Ireland debut on 18 December. He joined permanently on a free transfer in May 1967. He retired in 1968.

== International career ==
O'Neill won his first Republic of Ireland cap in a 6–0 defeat at the hands of Spain on 1 June 1952 in Madrid. Despite conceding six, it was Ireland's defenders who were culpable for the goals, and so O'Neill was retained and went on to win another 16 caps for his country. He played three games of qualifying for the 1954 FIFA World Cup, and one game of qualifying for the 1958 FIFA World Cup. He left the international scene after Alan Kelly established himself as Ireland's number one.

== Style of play ==
O'Neill was not a tall man, but he was an extremely acrobatic keeper with a natural ability to catch powerful airborne shots and make it look easy. He was adept at dealing with crosses and had excellent handling abilities.

== Post-retirement ==
Following his retirement from football he ran a taxi firm in Ormskirk. At the time of his death, 15 December 2007, he was living in Marians Drive, Ormskirk, Lancashire.

== Career statistics ==
=== Club statistics ===
Appearances and goals by club, season and competition
Club	Season	League			FA Cup		League Cup		Total	
Club	Season	Division	Apps	Goals	Apps	Goals	Apps	Goals	Apps	Goals
Everton	1950–51	First Division	10	0	0	0	–		10	0
Everton	1951–52	Second Division	20	0	0	0	–		20	0
Everton	1952–53	Second Division	35	0	5	0	–		40	0
Everton	1953–54	Second Division	28	0	3	0	–		31	0
Everton	1954–55	First Division	41	0	2	0	–		43	0
Everton	1955–56	First Division	34	0	2	0	–		36	0
Everton	1956–57	First Division	13	0	0	0	–		13	0
Everton	1957–58	First Division	6	0	0	0	–		6	0
Everton	1958–59	First Division	9	0	0	0	–		9	0
Everton	1959–60	First Division	5	0	0	0	–		5	0
Everton	Total		201	0	12	0	–		213	0
Stoke City	1960–61	Second Division	41	0	6	0	1	0	48	0
Stoke City	1961–62	Second Division	41	0	3	0	2	0	46	0
Stoke City	1962–63	Second Division	42	0	1	0	2	0	45	0
Stoke City	1963–64	First Division	6	0	0	0	4	0	10	0
Stoke City	Total		130	0	10	0	9	0	149	0
Darlington	1963–64	Fourth Division	3	0	0	0	0	0	3	0
Darlington	1964–65	Fourth Division	29	0	4	0	2	0	35	0
Darlington	Total		32	0	4	0	2	0	38	0
Port Vale	1964–65	Third Division	13	0	0	0	0	0	13	0
Port Vale	1965–66	Fourth Division	29	0	4	0	2	0	35	0
Port Vale	Total		42	0	4	0	2	0	48	0
Career total			405	0	30	0	13	0	448	0

=== International statistics ===
Republic of Ireland national team
Year	Apps	Goals
1952	2	0
1953	4	0
1954	1	0
1955	5	0
1956	1	0
1958	2	0
1959	2	0
Total	17	0

== Honours ==
Everton

- Football League Second Division second-place promotion: 1953–54

Stoke City

- Football League Second Division: 1962–63
