= Graham Williams (footballer, born 1936) =

Welsh footballer (1936–2018)

Personal information
- Full name: Graham George Williams
- Date of birth: 31 December 1936
- Place of birth: Wrexham, Wales
- Date of death: 25 November 2018 (aged 81)
- Height: 5 ft 5 in (1.65 m)
- Position: Left winger

Youth career
- Wrexham
- Oswestry Town

Senior career*
Years	Team	Apps	(Gls)
1955–1956	Bradford City	8	(2)
1956–1959	Everton	31	(6)
1959–1964	Swansea Town	90	(18)
1965–1966	Wrexham	24	(6)
1966	Wellington Town		
1966–1968	Tranmere Rovers	74	(12)
1968–1969	Port Vale	23	(1)
1969–1970	Runcorn		
1970–1975	Oswestry Town		
Total		250	(45)

International career
- Wales under-23s
1961	Wales	5	(1)
- * Club domestic league appearances and goals

Graham George Williams (31 December 1936 – 25 November 2018) was a Welsh footballer. A left-sided winger, he scored 47 goals in 249 league games in a 14-year career in the English Football League. He also won five senior caps for Wales in 1961.

He began his career with Wrexham and Oswestry Town before moving to Everton via Bradford City in 1956. After three years on Merseyside, he returned to Wales to play for Swansea Town. He returned to his hometown club, Wrexham, in 1963 before joining Wellington Town in 1965. The next year, he returned to the Football League with Tranmere Rovers. He helped the club to win promotion out of the Fourth Division in 1966–67, before he signed with Port Vale in July 1968. He joined Northern Premier League side Runcorn in May 1969 and later turned out for Oswestry Town.

== Club career ==
=== Early career ===
Williams began his career in Welsh football with Wrexham and Oswestry Town, before he was signed by Bradford City manager Peter Jackson in August 1955. His two goals in eight Third Division North games in the 1955–56 season were enough to win him a move from Valley Parade to First Division side Everton in March 1956.

=== Everton ===
He made his Everton debut in a 2–1 defeat to Sunderland in March 1956. The "Toffees" struggled at the lower end of the table under the stewardship of Ian Buchan in 1956–57 and 1957–58, and showed little sign of improvement in the 1958–59 season under Johnny Carey. In his three years at Goodison Park, Williams scored six goals in 31 top-flight games.

=== Swansea City ===
In February 1959, Williams joined Second Division side Swansea Town for a £5,000 fee. Manager Trevor Morris said that "Some of Flicka's team-mates used to complain that they never knew what he would do with the ball. If they felt like that training with him every day, then what chance does the opposition have!" The "Swans" finished 12th in 1959–60, seventh in 1960–61, 20th in 1961–62, and 15th in 1962–63. He won the Welsh Cup with Swansea in 1961 following a 3–1 win over Bangor City in the final at Ninian Park. In four seasons at Vetch Field, Williams scored 20 goals in 89 league games before breaking his leg.

=== Later career ===
He then made a return to Wrexham in July 1964. Ken Barnes's "Dragons" were relegated out of the Third Division in 1963–64, and could only manage a 14th-place finish in the Fourth Division in 1964–65. Williams then left the Racecourse Ground for non-League side Wellington Town, who went on to finish 13th in the Premier Division of the Southern League in 1965–66. He signed with Tranmere Rovers in the summer of 1966. He helped Dave Russell's side to win promotion out of the Fourth Division in 1966–67. Williams remained at Prenton Park for the 1967–68 season, as the "Superwhites" finished three points above the relegation zone. Williams joined Fourth Division club Port Vale in July 1968. He scored one goal in 25 league and cup appearances in the 1968–69 season, before he was dropped by manager Gordon Lee in January 1969. He was given a free transfer away from Vale Park in May 1969, and moved on to Northern Premier League side Runcorn. He later moved on to Oswestry Town.

== International career ==
Williams earned five Welsh caps in 1961 after playing at the under-23 and schoolboy levels.

== Personal life ==
He was nicknamed 'Flicka', and a racehorse, Son of Flicka, was named after him. Following his football career, Williams worked as a carpenter. He was also an accomplished amateur golfer. He died suddenly on 25 November 2018, leaving behind wife Maureen.

== Career statistics ==
Appearances and goals by club, season and competition
Club	Season	League			FA Cup		League Cup		Total	
Club	Season	Division	Apps	Goals	Apps	Goals	Apps	Goals	Apps	Goals
Bradford City	1955–56	Third Division North	8	2	0	0	—		8	2
Everton	1955–56	First Division	2	0	0	0	—		2	0
Everton	1956–57	First Division	9	3	0	0	—		9	3
Everton	1957–58	First Division	13	2	0	0	—		13	2
Everton	1958–59	First Division	7	1	2	0	—		9	1
Everton	Total		31	6	2	0	0	0	33	6
Swansea Town	1958–59	Second Division	15	1	0	0	—		15	1
Swansea Town	1959–60	Second Division	17	3	0	0	—		17	3
Swansea Town	1960–61	Second Division	33	9	3	0	1	0	37	9
Swansea Town	1961–62	Second Division	25	5	1	0	2	0	28	5
Swansea Town	Total		90	18	4	0	3	0	97	18
Wrexham	1964–65	Fourth Division	24	6	0	0	1	0	25	6
Tranmere Rovers	1966–67	Fourth Division	39	9	3	1	2	0	44	10
Tranmere Rovers	1967–68	Third Division	35	3	5	2	2	0	42	5
Tranmere Rovers	Total		74	12	8	3	4	0	86	15
Port Vale	1968–69	Fourth Division	23	1	1	0	1	0	25	1
Career total			250	45	15	3	9	0	274	48

== Honours ==
Tranmere Rovers

- Football League Fourth Division fourth-place promotion: 1966–67
