= John King (footballer, born 1938) =

English footballer & manager (1938–2016)

Personal information
- Full name: John Allen King
- Date of birth: 15 April 1938
- Place of birth: Marylebone, England
- Date of death: 30 March 2016 (aged 77)
- Height: 5 ft 7 in (1.70 m)
- Position: Wing half

Youth career
- Everton

Senior career*
Years	Team	Apps	(Gls)
1957–1960	Everton	48	(1)
1960	Bournemouth & Boscombe Athletic	21	(1)
1960–1968	Tranmere Rovers	242	(4)
1968–1971	Port Vale	101	(0)
1971–1972	Wigan Athletic	12	(0)
Total		424	(6)

Managerial career
- 1975–1980: Tranmere Rovers
- 1981–1984: Northwich Victoria
- 1985–1987: Caernarfon Town
- 1987–1996: Tranmere Rovers
- * Club domestic league appearances and goals

John Allen King (15 April 1938 – 30 March 2016) was an English football player and manager. He is widely regarded as being the most successful manager in the history of Tranmere Rovers and had a stand at Prenton Park named in his honour in 2002. In November 2014, a statue of King was unveiled outside the ground.

He played at wing half and made 411 league appearances in a 14-year career in the Football League. He began his career at Everton, playing for the club in the top flight between 1957 and 1960. He then moved on to Tranmere Rovers via Bournemouth & Boscombe Athletic. He helped Rovers to win promotion out of the Fourth Division in 1966–67, before he signed with Port Vale in June 1968. He helped the "Valiants" to promotion out of the Fourth Division in 1969–70 before he joined non-League Wigan Athletic in May 1971.

He found more success as a manager than a player, gaining his first management post at former club Tranmere Rovers in April 1975. He guided Tranmere to promotion out of the Fourth Division in 1975–76 before he was dismissed in September 1980. He then had successful spells in charge at non-League clubs Northwich Victoria (winning the FA Trophy in 1984) and Caernarfon Town, before making his return to Tranmere Rovers in 1987. He immediately steered the club away from losing their Football League status before taking them to promotion in 1988–89. He further took them to the Associate Members' Cup title in 1990, the Football League Trophy final in 1991, as well as promotion out of the Third Division as winners of the play-offs. His team narrowly missed out on promotion to the Premier League, reaching the play-offs three times between 1993 and 1995, also reaching the semi-finals of the League Cup. He became Tranmere's Director of football in April 1996.

== Early life ==
According to British Library records, John King was born in the Marylebone district of London on 15 April 1938. His parents, Henry J. King and Maud H. Dryland, were married in Ashford in Kent in 1934.

== Playing career ==
King started his career at Everton in 1957. He made 48 First Division appearances at Goodison Park under Ian Buchan and Johnny Carey over the course of the 1957–58, 1958–59, and 1959–60 campaigns. He then moved on to Bournemouth & Boscombe Athletic, playing 21 Third Division games under Don Welsh, before he joined Tranmere Rovers and being signed by Walter Galbraith. Rovers were relegated out of the Third Division in 1960–61. New manager Dave Russell led them to a 15th-place finish in the Fourth Division in 1961–62. They then reached eighth in 1962–63 and seventh in 1963–64, before finishing fifth in 1964–65, just one place and one point behind promoted Oxford United. They came even closer in 1965–66, finishing behind promoted Colchester United on goal average. Rovers finally achieved their goal in 1966–67, winning promotion in fourth place; they finished four points ahead of fifth-place Crewe Alexandra. They retained their third-tier status in 1967–68, finishing two places above the relegation zone. Over eight years at Prenton Park, King made 264 appearances in all competitions.

He signed with Port Vale in June 1968. He made 46 appearances in 1968–69, helping Gordon Lee's "Valiants" to a 13th-place finish in the Fourth Division. He played alongside Roy Sproson in a team which was based around defence. He played in a goalless home draw with Swansea Town on 18 October 1969, despite having chickenpox at the time, and played a total of 41 games in the 1969–70 promotion season. King chipped his ankle bone in November 1970 and was sidelined for four months; therefore, he could only play 27 games in 1970–71. He left on a free transfer to Northern Premier League side Wigan Athletic in May 1971, making 12 appearances in the 1971–72 campaign, his only season at Springfield Park.

== Managerial career ==
=== Tranmere Rovers ===
King was first appointed as Tranmere Rovers manager in April 1975 and led his charges to promotion out of the Fourth Division in 1975–76. He stabilised the club in the Third Division in 1976–77, and another mid-table finish followed in 1977–78. However, Rovers were relegated in 23rd place in 1978–79, finishing 12 points behind 20th place Chesterfield. Rovers then dropped to 15th in the bottom tier in 1979–80. King was dismissed in September 1980, but new manager, Bryan Hamilton, could not prevent Tranmere from finishing in the re-election zone in 1980–81.

=== Northwich Victoria ===
King moved on to Rochdale as a coach before taking the reins at Northwich Victoria in October 1981. He took the club to sixth in the Alliance Premier League in 1981–82, eighth in 1982–83, and seventh in 1983–84. He took Victoria to Wembley in 1983, where they lost 2–0 to Telford United in the FA Trophy. They travelled to Wembley again for the FA Trophy final in 1984, though a 1–1 draw meant that a replay was held at the Victoria Ground in Stoke-on-Trent; Northwich then beat Bangor City 2–1 to take the trophy back to Drill Field. He also led the club to the Cheshire Senior Cup title in 1984.

=== Caernarfon Town ===
King took charge at Welsh club Caernarfon Town. At Northern Premier League side Caernarfon he was at the helm for some of the most successful seasons in the club's history, including the club's 1986–87 FA Cup run to the third round, recording victories over Football League sides Stockport County and York City.

=== Return to Tranmere Rovers ===
King was appointed manager of Tranmere for a second time by Peter Johnson towards the end of the 1986–87 season, with the club fighting to avoid relegation out of the Football League. Safety was only guaranteed in the last game of the season with a 1–0 home win over Exeter City. King signed Jim Steel to act as a target man for striker Ian Muir. The move was inspired, and the team enjoyed considerable success in the following seasons. They rose to a mid-table finish in 1987–88, before winning promotion as Fourth Division runners-up in 1988–89. Tranmere then finished fourth in the Third Division in 1989–90, missing out on a second successive promotion after losing 2–0 to Notts County in the play-off final. They played at Wembley four times in two years, winning the Associate Members' Cup in 1990 with a 2–1 victory over Bristol Rovers. He led the "Superwhites" promotion with a 1–0 win over Bolton Wanderers in the 1991 play-off final, after Tranmere finished fifth in 1990–91. They also reached the Associate Members' Cup final for a second successive year, losing 3–2 to Birmingham City.

They finished a comfortable 14th in 1991–92, before hitting fourth in 1992–93. This qualified them for the play-offs; however, they were beaten 5–4 on aggregate by Swindon Town at the semi-final stage. The club again narrowly missed out on promotion to the Premier League in 1993–94, losing to Leicester City in the play-off semi-finals. They also reached the semi-finals of the League Cup, losing to Aston Villa on penalties.

King brought big-name signings such as John Aldridge, Pat Nevin and Gary Stevens to Prenton Park, but their crowds did not increase much. The club had to sell players such as Steve Vickers and Ian Nolan to survive. Tranmere nevertheless qualified for the play-offs for a third successive season in 1994–95, finishing fifth, before being beaten 3–1 by Reading at the play-off semi-final stage. In April 1996, with Rovers struggling for form in the league, chairman Frank Corfe appointed John Aldridge as player-manager, and King became Director of football. They finished the 1995–96 campaign in 13th position.

== Career statistics ==
Appearances and goals by club, season and competition
Club	Season	League			FA Cup		League Cup		Total	
Club	Season	Division	Apps	Goals	Apps	Goals	Apps	Goals	Apps	Goals
Everton	1957–58	First Division	5	0	0	0	—		5	0
Everton	1958–59	First Division	17	1	0	0	—		17	1
Everton	1959–60	First Division	26	0	1	0	—		27	0
Everton	Total		48	1	1	0	0	0	49	1
Bournemouth & Boscombe Athletic	1960–61	Third Division	21	1	1	0	2	0	24	1
Tranmere Rovers	1960–61	Third Division	17	0	0	0	0	0	17	0
Tranmere Rovers	1961–62	Fourth Division	38	1	1	0	2	0	41	1
Tranmere Rovers	1962–63	Fourth Division	39	1	4	1	1	0	44	2
Tranmere Rovers	1963–64	Fourth Division	42	1	1	0	3	0	46	1
Tranmere Rovers	1964–65	Fourth Division	45	0	2	0	2	0	49	0
Tranmere Rovers	1965–66	Fourth Division	8	0	0	0	0	0	8	0
Tranmere Rovers	1966–67	Fourth Division	20	1	1	0	0	0	21	1
Tranmere Rovers	1967–68	Third Division	33	0	4	0	2	0	39	0
Tranmere Rovers	Total		242	4	13	1	10	0	265	5
Port Vale	1968–69	Fourth Division	40	0	5	0	1	0	46	0
Port Vale	1969–70	Fourth Division	35	0	5	0	1	0	41	0
Port Vale	1970–71	Third Division	26	0	0	0	1	0	27	0
Port Vale	Total		101	0	10	0	3	0	114	0
Career total			412	6	25	1	15	0	452	7

== Honours ==
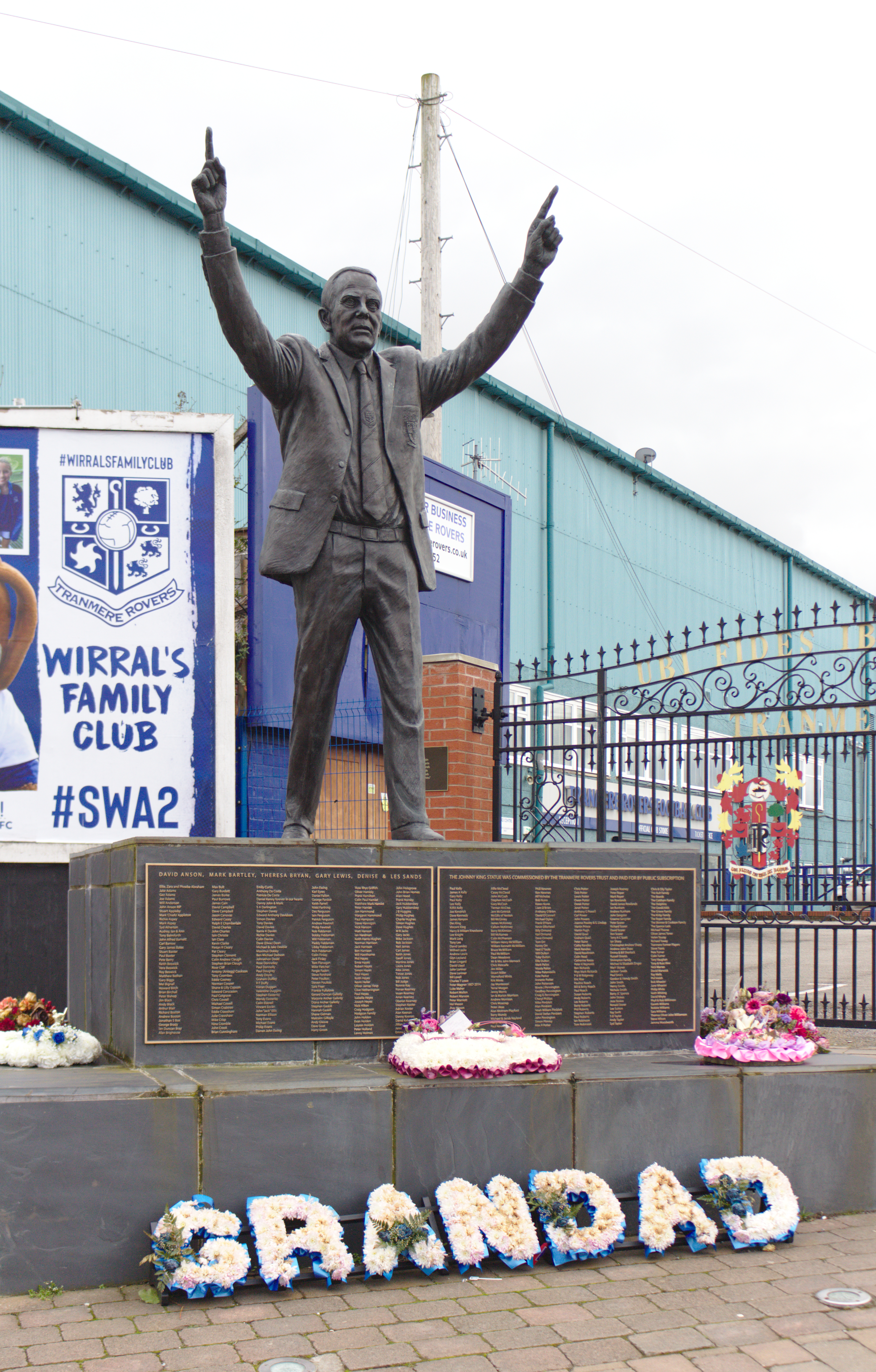
John King statue outside Prenton Park

=== As a player ===
Tranmere Rovers

- Football League Fourth Division fourth-place promotion: 1966–67

Port Vale

- Football League Fourth Division fourth-place promotion: 1969–70

=== As a manager ===
Tranmere Rovers

- Football League Third Division play-offs: 1991
- Football League Fourth Division fourth-place promotion: 1975–76
- Football League Fourth Division second-place promotion: 1988–89
- Associate Members' Cup: 1989–90; runner-up: 1990–91

Northwich Victoria

- FA Trophy 1983–84; runner-up 1982–83
- Cheshire Senior Cup: 1984

=== Recognition by Tranmere Rovers ===
The former Borough Road stand at Tranmere Rovers' ground, Prenton Park, was renamed the Johnny King Stand in 2002. On 1 November 2014, a bronze statue of King, designed by artist Tom Murphy, was unveiled outside the ground by King himself before the club's home match against Stevenage. Ben Harrison of the Tranmere Rovers Supporters Club said that "Johnny King is the club's greatest ever manager and is rightly revered by every Tranmere supporter. A loyal servant as both player and manager, the unparalleled success and style of football played by his teams as we rose from near oblivion to the verge of the Premier League will always be fondly remembered at Prenton Park."
