= Bert Llewellyn =

English footballer (1939-2016)

Personal information
- Full name: Herbert Arthur Llewellyn
- Date of birth: 5 February 1939
- Place of birth: Golborne, Lancashire, England
- Date of death: 8 September 2016 (aged 77)
- Height: 5 ft 4 in (1.63 m)
- Position: Centre-forward

Youth career
- Everton

Senior career*
Years	Team	Apps	(Gls)
1956–1958	Everton	11	(2)
1958–1960	Crewe Alexandra	96	(47)
1960–1963	Port Vale	88	(42)
1963	Northampton Town	1	(0)
1964–1965	Walsall	17	(6)
1965–1968	Wigan Athletic	115	(96)
Total		328	(193)
- * Club domestic league appearances and goals

Herbert Arthur Llewellyn (5 February 1939 – 8 September 2016) was an English footballer. A centre-forward, he scored 114 goals in 239 league and cup appearances in a nine-year career in the Football League.

He began his career at Everton in May 1956 and played eleven top-flight games before moving on to Crewe Alexandra in July 1958. He proved a prolific signing, hitting 51 goals in 96 league games, before he was sold to Port Vale for a £7,000 fee in November 1960. He was sold to Northampton Town for £7,000 in February 1963 but soon found himself without a club after breaking his leg 11 minutes into his "Cobblers" debut. He returned to the game with Walsall in February 1964 before he signed with Cheshire County League side Wigan Athletic in the summer of 1965. He spent three seasons with the "Latics", bagging 140 goals in 185 games as the club won a succession of minor trophies.

== Career ==
Llewellyn signed his first senior contract with Everton in May 1956. He scored on his "Toffees" debut, a 2–0 win over Blackpool at Goodison Park on 22 August, and scored another goal three days later in a 2–2 draw at home to Bolton Wanderers. He went on to play nine further league games for Everton, without finding the net. Under the stewardship of Ian Buchan, the club finished 15th in the First Division in 1956–57, and then 16th in 1957–58.

He signed with Crewe Alexandra in July 1958. Harry Ware's "Railwaymen" finished 18th in the Fourth Division in 1958–59, and then 14th in 1959–60. In two years at Gresty Road, Llewellyn scored 51 goals in 96 league games.

He joined Norman Low's Third Division Port Vale for a £7,000 fee in November 1960. He scored on his debut in a 1–0 victory over Barnsley at Vale Park on 12 November. He scored a hat-trick in a 4–1 home win over Hull City on 10 December, and again in a 4–1 home win over Swindon Town on 18 February. He finished the 1960–61 season with 20 goals in 32 appearances, and was a member of the team that won the Supporters' Clubs' Trophy in 1961.

Llewellyn scored 20 goals in 50 games in the 1961–62 season to become the club's joint-top scorer (with Arthur Longbottom). He hit his third hat-trick for the "Valiants" on 6 January, in a 3–1 FA Cup victory over Northampton Town. He scored 10 goals in 21 games in 1962–63, including a hat-trick past Crystal Palace in a 4–1 home win on 8 December. However, he was sold to Dave Bowen's Northampton Town for £7,000 by new manager Freddie Steele in February 1963; Steele had sold off strike-partner Longbottom the previous month.

Llewellyn only played eleven minutes of one match for the "Cobblers" due to a serious leg injury he sustained on his debut. He, therefore, played little part in the club's Third Division title-winning campaign in 1962–63 and soon departed the County Ground. He moved on to Bill Moore's Walsall in February 1964. He scored six goals in 17 Third Division games in 1963–64 and 1964–65, a solid return for a striker just returning to fitness in a struggling team. He then left Fellows Park, and joined Allan Brown's Cheshire County League side Wigan Athletic.

Llewellyn made his league debut for Wigan against Buxton, scoring twice in a 4–3 win. He formed a solid partnership with Harry Lyon, and hit 57 goals in 57 games in his first season at Springfield Park, as the "Latics" finished as the league's runners-up in 1965–66. He also helped the club to win the Cheshire League Cup, Lancashire Junior Cup and Liverpool Non-League Senior Cup. He scored 28 goals in 40 games in 1966–67, as Wigan finished in second place again, whilst lifting four trophies: the Liverpool Non-League Senior Cup, Lancashire Floodlit Cup, and the Northern Floodlit League championship and cup. Llewellyn hit 18 goals in 35 league games in 1967–68, his last season in football. In all, he scored 140 goals in 185 appearances across all competitions in just three seasons at Wigan, playing under the management of four different men: Allan Brown, Alf Craig, Harry Leyland, and Allan Sanders. He hit five goals on two separate occasions, hit four goals in three other games, and also claimed a total of six hat-tricks.

== Career statistics ==
Appearances and goals by club, season and competition
Club	Season	League			FA Cup		Other		Total	
Club	Season	Division	Apps	Goals	Apps	Goals	Apps	Goals	Apps	Goals
Everton	1956–57	First Division	10	2	0	0	0	0	10	2
Everton	1957–58	First Division	1	0	0	0	0	0	1	0
Everton	Total		11	2	0	0	0	0	11	2
Crewe Alexandra	1958–59	Fourth Division	41	15	2	1	0	0	43	16
Crewe Alexandra	1959–60	Fourth Division	40	25	6	5	0	0	46	30
Crewe Alexandra	1960–61	Fourth Division	15	7	0	0	2	2	17	9
Crewe Alexandra	Total		96	47	8	6	2	2	106	55
Port Vale	1960–61	Third Division	28	20	2	0	0	0	30	20
Port Vale	1961–62	Third Division	42	15	7	4	1	1	50	20
Port Vale	1962–63	Third Division	18	7	2	3	1	0	21	10
Port Vale	Total		88	42	11	7	2	1	101	50
Northampton Town	1962–63	Third Division	1	0	0	0	0	0	1	0
Northampton Town	1963–64	Second Division	0	0	0	0	1	0	1	0
Northampton Town	Total		1	0	0	0	1	0	2	0
Walsall	1963–64	Third Division	10	4	0	0	0	0	10	4
Walsall	1964–65	Third Division	7	2	0	0	2	1	9	3
Walsall	Total		17	6	0	0	2	1	19	7
Wigan Athletic total			115	96	0	0	70	44	185	140
Career total			328	193	19	13	77	48	424	254

== Honours ==
Wigan Athletic

- Cheshire League Cup: 1966
- Lancashire Junior Cup: 1966
- Liverpool Non-League Senior Cup: 1966 & 1967
- Lancashire Floodlit Cup: 1967
- Northern Floodlit League Championship: 1967
- Northern Floodlit League Cup: 1967
