= 1962–63 Northampton Town F.C. season =

Northampton Town
1962–63 season
- Chairman: Fred York
- Manager: Dave Bowen
- Stadium: County Ground
- Division Three: 1st
- FA Cup: First round
- League Cup: Third round
- Top goalscorer: League: Alec Ashworth (25); All: Alec Ashworth (26)
- Highest home attendance: 18,717 vs Coventry City
- Lowest home attendance: 7,771 vs Colchester United
- Average home league attendance: 12,680

The 1962–63 season was Northampton Town's 66th season in their history and the second successive season in the Third Division. Alongside competing in Division Three, the club also participated in the FA Cup and League Cup.

== Players ==
As of match played 24 May 1963.

Name	Position	Nat.	Place of birth	Date of birth (age)	Apps	Goals	Previous club	Date signed	Fee
Goalkeepers
Chic Brodie	GK	(Scotland)	Duntocher	22 February 1937 (aged 26)	85	0	Wolverhampton Wanderers	September 1961	
Norman Coe	GK	(Wales)	Swansea	6 December 1940 (aged 22)	45	0	Arsenal	July 1960	
Vic Rouse	GK	(Wales)	Swansea	16 March 1936 (aged 27)	0	0	Crystal Palace	April 1963	£1,000
Full backs
Vic Cockcroft	LB	(England)	Birmingham	25 February 1941 (aged 22)	10	0	Wolverhampton Wanderers	July 1962	
Mike Everitt	LB	(England)	Weeley	16 January 1941 (aged 22)	87	11	Arsenal	February 1961	£4,000
Arnold Woollard	LB	(Bermuda)	Pembroke	24 August 1930 (aged 32)	31	0	Bournemouth	March 1962	
Theo Foley	RB	(Republic of Ireland)	Dublin	2 April 1937 (aged 26)	95	1	Exeter City	May 1961	£1,000
Half backs
Terry Branston	CH	(England)	Rugby	25 July 1938 (aged 24)	115	0	Apprentice	October 1958	N/A
Graham Carr	CH	(England)	Corbridge	25 October 1944 (aged 18)	1	0	Apprentice	August 1962	N/A
John Kurila	WH	(Scotland)	Glasgow	10 April 1941 (aged 22)	43	1	Celtic	August 1962	
Derek Leck	WH	(England)	Deal	8 February 1937 (aged 26)	174	39	Millwall	June 1958	
Roly Mills	WH	(England)	Daventry	22 June 1933 (aged 29)	299	31	Apprentice	May 1951	N/A
Inside/Outside forwards
Billy Best	OF	(Scotland)	Glasgow	7 September 1942 (aged 20)	0	0	Pollok	July 1962	
Billy Hails	OF	(England)	Nettlesworth	19 February 1935 (aged 28)	26	5	Peterborough United	November 1962	
Barry Lines	OF	(England)	Bletchley	16 May 1942 (aged 21)	119	37	Bletchley Town	September 1960	
Tommy Robson	OF	(England)	Gateshead	31 July 1944 (aged 18)	5	1	Newcastle United	August 1961	N/A
Brian Etheridge	IF	(England)	Northampton	4 March 1944 (aged 19)	4	0	Apprentice	July 1961	N/A
John Reid	IF	(Scotland)	Newmains	20 August 1932 (aged 30)	70	15	Bradford City	November 1961	
Don Martin	IF	(England)	Corby	15 February 1944 (aged 19)	2	0	Apprentice	July 1962	N/A
Ray Smith	IF	(England)	Kingston upon Hull	13 September 1934 (aged 28)	14	4	Peterborough United	October 1962	
Centre forwards
Alec Ashworth (c)	CF	(England)	Southport	1 October 1939 (aged 23)	34	26	Luton Town	July 1962	
Frank Large	CF	(England)	Leeds	26 January 1940 (aged 23)	20	18	Queens Park Rangers	March 1963	
Bert Llewellyn	CF	(England)	Golborne	5 February 1939 (aged 24)	1	0	Port Vale	February 1963	£7,000

== Competitions ==
=== Division Three ===
==== League table ====
Pos	Team	Pld	W	D	L	GF	GA	GAv	Pts	Promotion or relegation
1	Northampton Town (C, P)	46	26	10	10	109	60	1.817	62	Promotion to the Second Division
2	Swindon Town (P)	46	22	14	10	87	56	1.554	58	Promotion to the Second Division
3	Port Vale	46	23	8	15	72	58	1.241	54	
4	Coventry City	46	18	17	11	83	69	1.203	53	
5	Bournemouth & Boscombe Athletic	46	18	16	12	63	46	1.370	52	

(C) Champions; (P) Promoted

==== Results summary ====
Overall								Home						Away					
Pld	W	D	L	GF	GA	GAv	Pts	W	D	L	GF	GA	Pts	W	D	L	GF	GA	Pts
46	26	10	10	109	60	1.817	62	16	6	1	64	19	38	10	4	9	45	41	24

Last updated: 8 May 2020.

==== League position by match ====
Round	1	2	3	4	5	6	7	8	9	10	11	12	13	14	15	16	17	18	19	20	21	22	23	24	25	26	27	28	29	30	31	32	33	34	35	36	37	38	39	40	41	42	43	44	45	46
Ground	A	A	H	H	A	H	A	H	H	A	A	H	H	A	A	H	A	A	A	H	H	A	A	A	A	A	H	A	H	H	A	H	H	H	A	H	A	H	H	A	H	H	A	H	A	H
Result	D	W	W	L	D	W	D	W	W	W	L	W	D	W	D	W	W	L	L	D	D	L	W	L	W	L	D	W	W	W	L	D	W	D	L	W	W	W	W	W	W	W	L	W	W	W
Position	14	10	7	10	16	9	12	5	4	1	3	2	2	1	1	1	1	1	1	2	2	3	2	4	3	6	4	5	3	3	3	3	2	2	3	2	1	2	1	1	1	1	1	1	1	1

Source: 11v11.com
A = Away; H = Home; W = Win; D = Draw; L = Loss

==== Matches ====
Win Draw Loss

21 August 1962 1	Bristol Rovers	2–2	Northampton Town	Bristol
19:15 BST			C.Holton; B.Lines	Stadium: Eastville Stadium; Attendance: 11,649

25 August 1962 2	Swindon Town	2–3	Northampton Town	Swindon
BST	C.Jackson 10'; A.D'Arcy 72'	Report	C.Holton 67'; R.Sanders 77'; A.Ashworth 82'	Stadium: County Ground; Attendance: 13,174; Referee: Ken Aston

28 August 1962 3	Northampton Town	2–0	Bristol Rovers	Northampton
19:30 BST	A.Ashworth			Stadium: County Ground; Attendance: 15,661; Referee: Dick Windle

1 September 1962 4	Northampton Town	2–3	Peterborough United	Northampton
BST	C.Holton; J.Reid			Stadium: County Ground; Attendance: 16,064

8 September 1962 5	Barnsley	1–1	Northampton Town	Barnsley
BST			A.Ashworth	Stadium: Oakwell; Attendance: 7,674

11 September 1962 6	Northampton Town	8–0	Wrexham	Northampton
BST	A.Ashworth; C.Holton; J.Reid; B.Lines			Stadium: County Ground; Attendance: 9,555

15 September 1962 7	Colchester United	2–2	Northampton Town	Colchester
BST	B.Hunt 34'; P.Wright 69'		A.Ashworth 26', 51'	Stadium: Layer Road; Attendance: 5,413; Referee: Norman Burtenshaw

17 September 1962 8	Northampton Town	7–1	Halifax Town	Northampton
BST	A.Ashworth; C.Holton; B.Lines; D.Leck			Stadium: County Ground; Attendance: 13,975

22 September 1962 9	Northampton Town	1–0	Queens Park Rangers	Northampton
BST	A.Ashworth			Stadium: County Ground; Attendance: 15,469

24 September 1962 10	Halifax Town	1–3	Northampton Town	Halifax
BST			C.Holton; B.Lines	Stadium: The Shay; Attendance: 4,202

29 September 1962 11	Hull City	2–0	Northampton Town	Kingston upon Hull
15:00 BST				Stadium: Boothferry Park; Attendance: 9,536

2 October 1962 12	Northampton Town	3–1	Crystal Palace	Northampton
BST	C.Holton; D.Leck; G.Evans			Stadium: County Ground; Attendance: 14,204

6 October 1962 13	Northampton Town	2–2	Bournemouth & Boscombe Athletic	Northampton
BST	C.Holton; B.Lines			Stadium: County Ground; Attendance: 12,199

10 October 1962 14	Crystal Palace	1–2	Northampton Town	Selhurst, London
BST			A.Ashworth; B.Lines	Stadium: Selhurst Park; Attendance: 13,319

13 October 1962 15	Coventry City	1–1	Northampton Town	Coventry
BST	T.Bly		A.Ashworth	Stadium: Highfield Road; Attendance: 22,163

20 October 1962 16	Northampton Town	3–1	Bradford (Park Avenue)	Northampton
BST	A.Ashworth; J.Reid; Williamson o.g.'			Stadium: County Ground; Attendance: 12,634

24 October 1962 17	Wrexham	1–4	Northampton Town	Wrexham, Wales
19:15 BST			A.Ashworth; C.Holton	Stadium: Racecourse Ground; Attendance: 18,841

27 October 1962 18	Watford	4–2	Northampton Town	Watford
15:00 BST			B.Lines; R.Sanders; A.Ashworth (red card)	Stadium: Vicarage Road; Attendance: 19,015

10 November 1962 19	Reading	2–1	Northampton Town	Reading
GMT			A.Ashworth	Stadium: Elm Park; Attendance: 7,402

17 November 1962 20	Northampton Town	0–0	Port Vale	Northampton
GMT				Stadium: County Ground; Attendance: 8,718

1 December 1962 21	Northampton Town	1–1	Millwall	Northampton
GMT	B.Hails			Stadium: County Ground; Attendance: 10,198

8 December 1962 22	Southend United	5–1	Northampton Town	Southend-on-Sea
GMT			A.Ashworth	Stadium: Roots Hall; Attendance: 8,203

15 December 1962 23	Carlisle United	1–2	Northampton Town	Carlisle
15:00 GMT			A.Ashworth; J.Reid	Stadium: Brunton Park; Attendance: 3,933

26 December 1962 24	Notts County	2–1	Northampton Town	Nottingham
GMT			B.Lines	Stadium: Meadow Lane; Attendance: 6,614

9 February 1963 25	Queens Park Rangers	1–3	Northampton Town	White City, London
15:00 GMT			A.Ashworth; B.Lines	Stadium: Loftus Road; Attendance: 14,238

23 February 1963 26	Bournemouth & Boscombe Athletic	3–0	Northampton Town	Bournemouth
15:00 GMT				Stadium: Dean Court; Attendance: 10,230

2 March 1963 27	Northampton Town	0–0	Coventry City	Northampton
GMT				Stadium: County Ground; Attendance: 18,717

9 March 1963 28	Bradford (Park Avenue)	2–3	Northampton Town	Bradford
GMT			F.Large; B.Lines	Stadium: Park Avenue; Attendance: 6,551

12 March 1963 29	Northampton Town	3–1	Colchester United	Northampton
GMT	F.Large 4', 43', 78'		M.King 15'	Stadium: County Ground; Attendance: 9,981

16 March 1963 30	Northampton Town	1–0	Watford	Northampton
GMT	M.Everitt			Stadium: County Ground; Attendance: 12,230

23 March 1963 31	Bristol City	3–1	Northampton Town	Bristol
15:00 GMT			J.Reid	Stadium: Ashton Gate; Attendance: 9,642

26 March 1963 32	Northampton Town	1–1	Swindon Town	Northampton
GMT	B.Hails 38'	Report	J.Smith 14'	Stadium: County Ground; Attendance: 16,812; Referee: G M Hartley
Note: Fixture was previously postponed on 22 December 1962.

30 March 1963 33	Northampton Town	5–0	Reading	Northampton
GMT	A.Ashworth; F.Large			Stadium: County Ground; Attendance: 7,845

2 April 1963 34	Northampton Town	2–2	Notts County	Northampton
BST	A.Ashworth; B.Lines			Stadium: County Ground; Attendance: 14,606
Note: Fixture was previously postponed on 29 December 1962.

6 April 1963 35	Port Vale	3–1	Northampton Town	Burslem
BST			B.Lines	Stadium: Vale Park; Attendance: 8,781

8 April 1963 36	Northampton Town	5–1	Bristol City	Northampton
BST	F.Large; R.Mills; R.Smith			Stadium: County Ground; Attendance: 12,366

12 April 1963 37	Brighton & Hove Albion	0–5	Northampton Town	Hove
15:00 BST			B.Hails; F.Large; D.Leck; R.Jennings o.g.'	Stadium: Goldstone Ground; Attendance: 16,354

13 April 1963 38	Northampton Town	5–1	Shrewsbury Town	Northampton
BST	F.Large			Stadium: County Ground; Attendance: 13,350

16 April 1963 39	Northampton Town	3–0	Brighton & Hove Albion	Northampton
BST	J.Kurila; F.Large; R.Jennings o.g.'			Stadium: County Ground; Attendance: 17,520

20 April 1963 40	Millwall	1–3	Northampton Town	Millwall, London
15:15 BST			B.Hails; J.Reid	Stadium: The Den; Attendance: 9,992

23 April 1963 41	Northampton Town	4–2	Barnsley	Northampton
BST	F.Large; J.Reid			Stadium: County Ground; Attendance: 15,939

27 April 1963 42	Northampton Town	5–3	Southend United	Northampton
BST	F.Large; J.Reid; R.Smith			Stadium: County Ground; Attendance: 13,498

1 May 1963 43	Shrewsbury Town	1–0	Northampton Town	Shrewsbury
BST			B.Hails; J.Reid	Stadium: Gay Meadow; Attendance: 6,052

9 May 1963 44	Northampton Town	2–0	Carlisle United	Northampton
BST	F.Large			Stadium: County Ground; Attendance: 15,094

11 May 1963 45	Peterborough United	0–4	Northampton Town	Peterborough
15:15 BST			B.Hails; D.Leck; R.Smith; J.Rayner o.g.'	Stadium: London Road; Attendance: 17,518

24 May 1963 46	Northampton Town	3–0	Hull City	Northampton
BST	A.Ashworth; T.Foley; J.Reid			Stadium: County Ground; Attendance: 12,110

=== FA Cup ===
3 November 1962 First round	Torquay United	2–1	Northampton Town	Torquay
GMT			M.Everitt	Stadium: Plainmoor; Attendance: 11,844

=== League Cup ===
26 September 1962 Second round	Northampton Town	2–0	Colchester United	Northampton
19:30 BST	A.Ashworth; C.Holton			Stadium: County Ground; Attendance: 7,771

16 October 1962 Third round	Northampton Town	1–1	Preston North End	Northampton
BST	B.Lines			Stadium: County Ground; Attendance: 12,418

29 October 1962 Third round (r)	Preston North End	2–1	Northampton Town	Preston
19:30 GMT			J.Reid	Stadium: Deepdale; Attendance: 7,040

=== Appearances and goals ===
Pos	Player	Division Three		FA Cup		League Cup		Total	
Pos	Player	Starts	Goals	Starts	Goals	Starts	Goals	Starts	Goals
GK	Chic Brodie	46	–	1	–	3	–	50	–
GK	Norman Coe	–	–	–	–	–	–	–	–
GK	Vic Rouse	–	–	–	–	–	–	–	–
FB	Vic Cockcroft	8	–	1	–	1	–	10	–
FB	Mike Everitt	28	1	1	1	1	–	30	2
FB	Theo Foley	43	1	–	–	3	–	46	1
FB	Arnold Woollard	15	–	1	–	2	–	18	–
HB	Terry Branston	45	–	1	–	3	–	49	–
HB	Graham Carr	1	–	–	–	–	–	1	–
HB	John Kurila	40	1	1	–	2	–	43	1
HB	Derek Leck	42	5	1	–	3	–	46	5
HB	Roly Mills	19	1	–	–	–	–	19	1
OF	Billy Best	–	–	–	–	–	–	–	–
OF	Billy Hails	26	5	–	–	–	–	26	5
OF	Barry Lines	46	16	1	–	3	1	50	17
OF	Tommy Robson	1	–	–	–	–	–	1	–
IF	Brian Etheridge	–	–	–	–	–	–	–	–
IF	Don Martin	2	–	–	–	–	–	2	–
IF	John Reid	41	11	1	–	2	1	44	12
IF	Ray Smith	14	4	–	–	–	–	14	4
CF	Alec Ashworth	30	25	1	–	3	1	34	26
CF	Frank Large	20	18	–	–	–	–	20	18
CF	Bert Llewellyn	1	–	–	–	–	–	1	–
Players who left before end of season:
OF	Roy Sanders	15	2	1	–	3	–	19	2
CF	Cliff Holton	21	14	–	–	3	1	24	15
