= Ken Beamish =

English footballer (born 1947)

Personal information
- Full name: Kenneth George Beamish
- Date of birth: 25 August 1947 (age 79)
- Place of birth: Bebington, England
- Height: 6 ft 0 in (1.83 m)
- Position: Forward

Youth career
- Stork

Senior career*
Years	Team	Apps	(Gls)
1966–1972	Tranmere Rovers	178	(49)
1972–1974	Brighton & Hove Albion	96	(27)
1974–1976	Blackburn Rovers	86	(19)
1976–1978	Port Vale	85	(29)
1978–1979	Bury	49	(20)
1979–1981	Tranmere Rovers	59	(15)
1981–1982	Swindon Town	2	(0)
Total		555	(159)

Managerial career
- 1983–1984: Swindon Town
- * Club domestic league appearances and goals

Kenneth George Beamish (born 25 August 1947) is an English former football player, coach and manager. In his playing days, he was a forward, and he scored a total of 198 goals in 642 league and cup games throughout a 16-year career in the Football League.

He started his career at Tranmere Rovers in 1965, and in six years at the club would make close to 200 appearances. From March 1972, he spent three years with Brighton & Hove Albion, making around 100 appearances. In May 1974 he signed with Blackburn Rovers for £25,000, and went on to play close to 100 games with the club in two years. Bought by Port Vale for £12,000 in September 1976, he was voted the club's Player of the Year in 1977–78, and was the club's top scorer for two consecutive seasons. Sold to Bury for £35,000 in September 1978, he played around 50 games before he moved back to Tranmere Rovers in 1979. In 1981, he transferred to Swindon Town before he announced his retirement the following year. He later served as Swindon's manager in the 1983–84 campaign.

== Playing career ==
=== Tranmere Rovers ===
Beamish started his career with Fourth Division Tranmere Rovers in 1966, under the management of Dave Russell. Rovers missed out on promotion at the end of 1965–66 after finishing behind fourth-place Colchester United on goal average. Promotion was achieved in 1966–67, after the club finished fourth, four points ahead of Crewe Alexandra. Tranmere retained their Third Division status in 1967–68, 1968–69, 1969–70, and 1970–71. Beamish was the club's top scorer in two out of his six seasons. Now managed by Jackie Wright, Rovers struggled in 1971–72.

=== Brighton & Hove Albion ===
On 9 March 1972 – transfer deadline day, Beamish switched to league rivals Brighton & Hove Albion for a fee of £25,000 plus Alan Duffy, and saw his wages doubled. The club were already performing well with the strike duo of Willie Irvine and Kit Napier. However, the management felt that Beamish would offer more "bite" up front. Beamish enjoyed a successful start to his Brighton career, as he contributed six goals in twelve starts and two substitute appearances as the club won promotion as Third Division runners-up in 1971–72. Coach Ray Crawford stated that Beamish's goals helped the club to get over the line and clinch promotion. However, the club struggled in the Second Division, and finished in last place in 1972–73. Playing in a strike partnership with Barry Bridges, his nine Second Division goals made him the club's joint-top scorer. Manager Pat Saward was replaced by Brian Clough, but the 1973–74 campaign was also difficult, as Brighton avoided their second-successive relegation by eight points. Beamish finished as top-scorer with twelve goals but was not included on an end-of-season trip to Spain as Clough was reportedly dissatisfied with his lack of balance and poise. He said that he discovered he had been transfer-listed from his neighbour, who had heard the news on the radio.

=== Blackburn Rovers ===
Beamish was signed by Gordon Lee's Blackburn Rovers for a £25,000 fee in May 1974. He soon built a good understanding with strike partner Don Martin. The 1974–75 season was successful, as Blackburn were promoted to the Second Division as champions of the Third Division, with Beamish claiming 11 of he and Martin's 26 goal haul. Rovers finished mid-table in 1975–76 under the stewardship of Jim Smith. A popular player, fans would chant "Beamo, Beamo" years after he left Ewood Park.

=== Port Vale ===
He joined Third Division Port Vale for £12,000 in September 1976 and went straight into the first team. He became the club's top scorer in the 1976–77 season with 18 goals in 44 games; three of these goals came against Grimsby Town at Blundell Park on 3 January. He was voted Player of the Year for his 16 goals in 49 games in the 1977–78 season; he scored ten goals more than his closest rival Jeff Hemmerman, as the club were relegated to the Fourth Division. He started the 1978–79 campaign with four goals in four consecutive games before he was sold to Third Division Bury for £35,000 in September 1978.

=== Later career ===
He helped the "Shakers" to avoid relegation in 1978–79, as he scored 20 goals in 49 league games for the club before he returned to Tranmere Rovers in November 1979 for a fee of £10,000; Rovers were now back in the Fourth Division and managed by John King. Rovers suffered in 1979–80 and 1980–81, and had to apply (successfully) for re-election under Bryan Hamilton in 1981. He then transferred to Swindon Town on a free in May 1981, and played just two league games, as Swindon were relegated out of the Third Division in 1981–82.

== Style of play ==
Beamish was a forward noted for his courage and aggression, though lacking in technical skill.

== Managerial career ==
After retiring as a player, he became manager of Swindon Town. John Trollope had originally brought Beamish to the club as his assistant. After Trollope's unsuccessful venture into management came to an end, Beamish took over the reins from him towards the end of the 1982–83 season. Working on a tight budget, Beamish was given only one full season in charge, in which he led the Town to their lowest ever league finish – 17th in Fourth Division. However, he did lead the club to the fourth round of the FA Cup, where former club Blackburn Rovers eliminated Swindon. When his contract expired at the end of the 1983–84 season, new sponsors Lowndes Lambert demanded a big-name manager, and Beamish was replaced by Lou Macari.

He worked at Blackburn Rovers as a commercial manager from 1986 until his retirement in August 2012. He later worked with AFC Fylde.

== Personal life ==
He married Lesley, and in 1973 the couple were living with daughter Kirstie at Saltdean, Sussex. He later lived in Euxton and got involved with local charitable causes.

== Career statistics ==
=== Playing statistics ===
Appearances and goals by club, season and competition
Club	Season	League			FA Cup		Other		Total	
Club	Season	Division	Apps	Goals	Apps	Goals	Apps	Goals	Apps	Goals
Tranmere Rovers	1965–66	Fourth Division	1	0	0	0	0	0	1	0
Tranmere Rovers	1966–67	Fourth Division	1	0	0	0	0	0	1	0
Tranmere Rovers	1967–68	Third Division	25	5	3	1	0	0	28	6
Tranmere Rovers	1968–69	Third Division	36	13	1	0	4	1	41	14
Tranmere Rovers	1969–70	Third Division	46	9	6	3	3	1	55	13
Tranmere Rovers	1970–71	Third Division	40	10	3	0	2	3	45	13
Tranmere Rovers	1971–72	Third Division	29	12	7	3	3	2	39	17
Tranmere Rovers	Total		178	49	20	7	12	7	210	63
Brighton & Hove Albion	1971–72	Third Division	14	6	0	0	0	0	14	6
Brighton & Hove Albion	1972–73	Second Division	38	9	1	0	1	1	40	10
Brighton & Hove Albion	1973–74	Third Division	44	12	0	0	1	0	45	12
Brighton & Hove Albion	Total		96	27	1	0	2	1	99	28
Blackburn Rovers	1974–75	Third Division	43	12	3	2	5	3	51	17
Blackburn Rovers	1975–76	Second Division	37	7	0	0	7	3	44	10
Blackburn Rovers	1976–77	Second Division	6	0	0	0	3	2	9	2
Blackburn Rovers	Total		86	19	3	2	15	8	104	29
Port Vale	1976–77	Third Division	37	12	5	4	2	2	44	18
Port Vale	1977–78	Third Division	42	13	4	3	3	0	49	16
Port Vale	1978–79	Fourth Division	6	4	0	0	2	0	8	4
Port Vale	Total		85	29	9	7	7	2	101	38
Bury	1978–79	Third Division	35	16	4	1	0	0	39	17
Bury	1979–80	Third Division	14	4	0	0	5	1	19	5
Bury	Total		49	20	4	1	5	1	58	22
Tranmere Rovers	1979–80	Fourth Division	27	9	3	2	0	0	30	11
Tranmere Rovers	1980–81	Fourth Division	32	6	2	1	4	0	38	7
Tranmere Rovers	Total		59	15	5	3	4	0	68	18
Swindon Town	1981–82	Third Division	2	0	0	0	0	0	2	0
Career total			555	159	42	20	45	19	642	198

=== Managerial statistics ===
Managerial record by team and tenure
Team	From	To	Record				
Team	From	To	P	W	D	L	Win %
Swindon Town	April 1983	June 1984	68	26	17	25	38.2
Total			68	26	17	25	38.2

== Honours ==
Brighton & Hove Albion

- Football League Third Division second-place promotion: 1971–72

Blackburn Rovers

- Football League Third Division: 1974–75

Individual

- Port Vale F.C. Player of the Year: 1977–78
