= Jim Steel (footballer) =

Scottish footballer

Personal information
- Full name: William James Steel
- Date of birth: 4 December 1959 (age 66)
- Place of birth: Dumfries, Scotland
- Height: 6 ft 3 in (1.91 m)
- Position: Centre forward

Youth career
- Oldham Athletic

Senior career*
Years	Team	Apps	(Gls)
1978–1983	Oldham Athletic	108	(24)
1982	→ Wigan Athletic (loan)	2	(2)
1982–1983	→ Wrexham (loan)	9	(6)
1983–1984	Port Vale	28	(6)
1984–1987	Wrexham	164	(51)
1987	→ Deportivo de La Coruña (loan)	4	(0)
1987–1992	Tranmere Rovers	174	(29)
Total		489	(118)
- * Club domestic league appearances and goals

William James Steel (born 4 December 1959) is a Scottish former professional association footballer. A big, aggressive player, his position was centre forward.

After starting his career with Oldham Athletic in 1978, he moved onto Port Vale in March 1983 for a £10,000 fee, following loan spells at Wigan Athletic and Wrexham. He won promotion with the club in 1982–83 before he joined Wrexham for £10,000 in January 1984. He scored a critical goal in his two European campaigns during his four years with the club and lifted the Welsh Cup. After a brief spell on loan at Deportivo de La Coruña, he then enjoyed numerous successes with Tranmere Rovers after joining the club in 1987. During his five years, the club won promotion twice and reached the final of the Football League Trophy twice, winning it in 1990. He retired in 1992, having made 485 league appearances in a 14-year career in the Football League, scoring 118 goals.

== Career ==
=== Oldham Athletic ===
Steel was born in Dumfries and raised in nearby Dalbeattie. He began his football career when he was signed as an apprentice by Jimmy Frizzell for Oldham Athletic. After scoring two goals against Cardiff City on his debut, he established himself in the first team as the "Latics" battled away in the lower half of the Second Division table in 1978–79, 1979–80, 1980–81, and 1981–82. During his time, he built successful strike partnership with Simon Stainrod and Rodger Wylde. Frizzell was dismissed in early 1982, and Steel was unable to establish himself under new manager Joe Royle. Steel had loan spells with Third Division clubs Wigan Athletic (scoring two goals in his two league games under Larry Lloyd) and Wrexham (where he scored six goals from his nine league games). Steel left Boundary Park in March 1983 after making 108 league appearances and scoring 24 goals.

=== Port Vale ===
Aged 23, Steel was bought by John McGrath at Port Vale for £10,000 in March 1983. He played in every game for the rest of that season as the club were promoted from the Fourth Division in third place. Vale struggled in the Third Division in the 1983–84 season, and Steel lost his place in the team in December, and McGrath lost his job.

=== Wrexham ===
The month after his 24th birthday, Steel returned to Wrexham (now in the Fourth Division) for £10,000 in January 1984. Of his non-loan moves, this was his most prolific period in front of goal, with 51 strikes in his 164 league games. Wrexham at the time could not afford the £10,000 transfer fee. Still, Steel joined the club after David Wells, a Wrexham-supporting businessman from Mold, made an interest-free loan to the club.

Following a Welsh Cup final defeat to Shrewsbury Town, Wrexham took on an F.C. Porto side of numerous Portuguese internationals in the 1984–85 European Cup Winners' Cup (Shrewsbury as an English club could not represent Wales in European competition). Wrexham won the opening leg at the Racecourse Ground 1–0, courtesy of a goal from Steel. He had taken the ball on his chest in the centre circle with his back to goal, volleyed the dropping ball for John Muldoon to attack and cross from the right wing into the penalty area, and then jumped to direct a bullet header past Petar Borota. In the second leg at Estádio das Antas, Porto were 3–0 up after 38 minutes. The Welsh club pulled two goals back before half-time. In the 61st minute, Paulo Futre restored Porto's aggregate lead before Wrexham's last-minute strike meant the tie finished level at 4–4, with Wrexham advancing on away goals.

The second round draw paired Wrexham with the previous season's European Cup runners-up, A.S. Roma, managed by Sven-Göran Eriksson. Wrexham lost 3–0 on aggregate over the two legs. Steel said of the adventure, "We went to Porto and there was a bloody hurricane. We come to Rome and the bloody shops are shut. When we play in Russia, Reagan will probably have the place blown up."

With Steel scoring both goals in a Welsh Cup final replay 2–1 win over Kidderminster Harriers, the "Dragons" appeared in the 1986–87 European Cup Winners' Cup with a first round draw against Maltese side Żurrieq, whom they beat 7–0 on aggregate. Steel scored in Wrexham in the second leg. This earned a second round tie against Real Zaragoza, which brought two goalless draws. At home, in extra time in the second leg, Wrexham matched the two goals by Patricio Yáñez to level the fixture at 2–2. However, on this occasion, away-goals counted against Steel's side. On 14 October 1986, he score a hat-trick in the league against Peterborough United.

With the Spanish league extended into the summer, Steel was allowed to go out on loan at Deportivo de La Coruña at the end of the 1986–87 season. He featured in four Segunda División games at Estadio Riazor, as Eusebio Ríos's side made an unsuccessful bid for promotion into La Liga.

=== Tranmere Rovers ===
Steel, now aged 27, moved on to Tranmere Rovers in late 1987. He moved for a then club record transfer fee, with the manager Johnny King looking to use Steel to act as target man for striker Ian Muir. They enjoyed considerable success together in the seasons to follow.

At the end of the 1987–88 season, Tranmere played at Wembley in the 16 team Football League Centenary Tournament. A good mid-season run of form saw Rovers qualify as one of the Fourth Division's two representatives. Tranmere were the surprise package of an otherwise derided tournament, beating First Division sides Wimbledon and Newcastle United before losing on penalties to eventual winners Nottingham Forest in the semi-final. This became the first of five trips to Wembley for Tranmere in Steel's time at Prenton Park.

Tranmere won promotion as Fourth Division runners-up in 1988–89. In the same season, Rovers knocked First Division Middlesbrough out of the League Cup. Rovers also went on to knock top-flight Millwall out of the same competition in 1989–90. Steel scored with a massive looping header against the Tottenham Hotspur side of Gary Lineker and Paul Gascoigne in a 2–2 draw in the next round to earn a replay. In October 1991, another top-flight team, Chelsea, took a League Cup exit at Prenton Park when they lost 3–1.

In their first season in the Third Division, 1989–90, Rovers earned a place in the play-offs after finishing in fourth place. They lost 2–0 to Notts County in the play-off final at Wembley Stadium. A week later at the Twin Towers, Rovers defeated Third Division champions, Bristol Rovers, 2–1 in the final of the Football League Trophy – this was Tranmere's first national piece of silverware. Club record scorer Ian Muir gave Tranmere an early lead with a volleyed strike. Devon White gave Bristol Rovers an equaliser early in the second half, before Steel headed a late winner.

Tranmere Rovers went one better in the 1990–91 season, winning the Third Division play-offs with a 1–0 win over Bolton Wanderers after a fifth-place finish. Chris Malkin's extra-time goal helped the club to promotion to the Second Division for the first time since the 1930s. Once again, Rovers made an appearance in the Football League Trophy final, this time losing 3–2 to Birmingham City, with Steel again on the scoresheet. This made the play-off victory over Bolton Tranmere's fourth appearance in a Wembley final in just over a year.

The 1991 promotion meant Steel played his last season at the level at which he began his senior career, England's second tier. Rovers finished their first season back at this level, 1991–92, comfortably in mid-table. In total, Steel scored 29 goals in 174 Tranmere league games before he retired from professional football at the age of 32.

== After football ==
Steel left football to start a career with the Merseyside Police force.

== Career statistics ==
Appearances and goals by club, season and competition
Club	Season	League			FA Cup		Other		Total	
Club	Season	Division	Apps	Goals	Apps	Goals	Apps	Goals	Apps	Goals
Oldham Athletic	1978–79	Second Division	7	4	2	0	5	1	14	5
Oldham Athletic	1979–80	Second Division	33	10	1	0	5	1	39	11
Oldham Athletic	1980–81	Second Division	24	3	2	0	2	0	28	3
Oldham Athletic	1981–82	Second Division	37	7	1	0	6	1	44	8
Oldham Athletic	1982–83	Second Division	7	0	0	0	0	0	7	0
Oldham Athletic	Total		108	24	6	0	18	3	132	27
Wigan Athletic (loan)	1982–83	Third Division	2	2	0	0	0	0	2	2
Wrexham (loan)	1982–83	Third Division	9	6	0	0	0	0	9	6
Port Vale	1982–83	Fourth Division	13	3	0	0	0	0	13	3
Port Vale	1983–84	Third Division	15	3	1	0	3	1	19	4
Port Vale	Total		28	6	1	0	3	1	32	7
Wrexham	1983–84	Fourth Division	21	0	0	0	3	1	24	1
Wrexham	1984–85	Fourth Division	45	14	1	0	8	1	54	15
Wrexham	1985–86	Fourth Division	43	14	2	0	4	2	49	16
Wrexham	1986–87	Fourth Division	37	17	3	1	12	3	52	21
Wrexham	1987–88	Fourth Division	18	6	1	0	4	0	23	6
Wrexham	Total		164	51	7	1	31	7	202	59
Tranmere Rovers	1987–88	Fourth Division	29	7	0	0	0	0	29	7
Tranmere Rovers	1988–89	Fourth Division	44	7	4	1	8	1	56	9
Tranmere Rovers	1989–90	Third Division	36	5	1	0	15	4	52	9
Tranmere Rovers	1990–91	Third Division	44	6	2	1	13	6	59	13
Tranmere Rovers	1991–92	Second Division	21	4	1	0	8	5	30	9
Tranmere Rovers	Total		174	29	8	2	44	16	226	47
Career total			485	118	22	3	96	27	603	148

== Honours ==
Port Vale

- Football League Fourth Division third-place promotion: 1982–83

Wrexham

- Welsh Cup: 1985–86

Tranmere Rovers

- Football League Fourth Division second-place promotion: 1988–89
- Football League Third Division play-offs: 1991
- Full Members' Cup: 1989–90; runner-up: 1990–91
