= 1991–92 Tranmere Rovers F.C. season =

Tranmere Rovers
1991–92 season
- Chairman: Peter Johnson
- Manager: John King
- Stadium: Prenton Park
- Second Division: 14th
- FA Cup: Third round
- League Cup: Third round
- Full Members Cup: Semi finals
- Top goalscorer: League: Aldridge (22); All: Aldridge (40)
- Average home league attendance: 8,845

During the 1991–92 English football season, Tranmere Rovers F.C. competed in the Football League Second Division.

== Season summary ==
In the 1991–92 season, Tranmere made a satisfying start to the campaign with only one defeat from their first eight league games and were mid-table by 8 November but their form began to dip afterwards where Tranmere won only 2 from their 14 league games and by 3 March were in 17th place and only 5 points clear of the relegation zone but in their final 16 league matches, Tranmere's form slightly improved, winning six of them which was enough to keep them up and they finished in 14th place.

== Final league table ==
| Pos | Team | Pld | W | D | L | GF | GA | GD | Pts | Qualification or relegation |
|---|---|---|---|---|---|---|---|---|---|---|
| 12 | Southend United | 46 | 17 | 11 | 18 | 63 | 63 | 0 | 62 | Qualification for the First Division (Note: From the 1992–93 season, the first tier became the Premier League, the second tier - then known as the Second Division - was renamed to the First Division, and the third tier - then known as the Third Division - was renamed to the Second Division.) |
| 13 | Bristol Rovers | 46 | 16 | 14 | 16 | 60 | 63 | −3 | 62 | Qualification for the First Division |
| 14 | Tranmere Rovers | 46 | 14 | 19 | 13 | 56 | 56 | 0 | 61 | Qualification for the First Division |
| 15 | Millwall | 46 | 17 | 10 | 19 | 64 | 71 | −7 | 61 | Qualification for the First Division |
| 16 | Barnsley | 46 | 16 | 11 | 19 | 46 | 57 | −11 | 59 | Qualification for the First Division |

Rules for classification: 1) Points; 2) Goal difference; 3) Goals scored

== Results ==
Tranmere Rovers' score comes first

=== Legend ===
| Win | Draw | Loss |

=== Football League Second Division ===
| Date | Opponent | Venue | Result | Attendance | Scorers |
|---|---|---|---|---|---|
| 17 August 1991 | Brighton & Hove Albion | A | 2–0 | 9,679 | Aldridge (2) |
| 23 August 1991 | Bristol Rovers | H | 2–2 | 10,150 | Aldridge, Steel |
| 31 August 1991 | Grimsby Town | A | 2–2 | 7,018 | Aldridge, Thomas |
| 3 September 1991 | Charlton Athletic | H | 2–2 | 7,609 | Hughes, Malkin |
| 7 September 1991 | Newcastle United | H | 3–2 | 11,465 | Vickers, Malkin, Thomas |
| 14 September 1991 | Bristol City | A | 2–2 | 11,235 | Brannan, Irons |
| 17 September 1991 | Middlesbrough | A | 0–1 | 16,550 | |
| 21 September 1991 | Barnsley | H | 2–1 | 8,482 | Higgins, Aldridge |
| 28 September 1991 | Blackburn Rovers | A | 0–0 | 11,402 | |
| 4 October 1991 | Southend United | H | 1–1 | 7,358 | Steel |
| 12 October 1991 | Oxford United | A | 0–1 | 5,760 | |
| 18 October 1991 | Cambridge United | H | 1–2 | 7,625 | Aldridge |
| 26 October 1991 | Wolverhampton Wanderers | A | 1–1 | 12,266 | Steel |
| 2 November 1991 | Derby County | A | 1–0 | 11,501 | Aldridge |
| 5 November 1991 | Millwall | H | 2–1 | 6,108 | Irons, Aldridge |
| 8 November 1991 | Plymouth Argyle | H | 1–0 | 7,490 | Aldridge |
| 22 November 1991 | Swindon Town | H | 0–0 | 9,589 | |
| 30 November 1991 | Ipswich Town | A | 0–4 | 11,061 | |
| 13 December 1991 | Port Vale | A | 1–1 | 6,426 | Cooper |
| 26 December 1991 | Sunderland | H | 1–0 | 13,658 | Irons |
| 28 December 1991 | Grimsby Town | H | 1–1 | 7,900 | Aldridge |
| 1 January 1992 | Watford | A | 0–0 | 9,892 | |
| 11 January 1992 | Bristol Rovers | A | 0–1 | 7,053 | |
| 17 January 1992 | Brighton & Hove Albion | H | 1–1 | 7,179 | Muir |
| 24 January 1992 | Watford | H | 1–1 | 6,187 | Morrissey |
| 31 January 1992 | Cambridge United | A | 0–0 | 5,491 | |
| 8 February 1992 | Wolverhampton Wanderers | H | 4–3 | 11,371 | Morrissey (2), Aldridge, Malkin |
| 11 February 1992 | Sunderland | A | 1–1 | 18,114 | Aldridge |
| 21 February 1992 | Ipswich Town | H | 0–1 | 9,161 | |
| 29 February 1992 | Portsmouth | A | 0–2 | 16,654 | |
| 6 March 1992 | Port Vale | H | 2–1 | 8,471 | Harvey, Aldridge |
| 11 March 1992 | Millwall | A | 3–0 | 6,456 | Morrissey, Aldridge (2) |
| 14 March 1992 | Derby County | H | 4–3 | 10,386 | Irons, Aldridge (3) |
| 17 March 1992 | Swindon Town | A | 0–2 | 7,261 | |
| 21 March 1992 | Plymouth Argyle | A | 0–1 | 7,447 | |
| 27 March 1992 | Leicester City | H | 1–2 | 7,272 | Muir |
| 31 March 1992 | Bristol City | H | 2–2 | 5,797 | Nolan, Steel |
| 4 April 1992 | Newcastle United | A | 3–2 | 21,361 | Morrissey, Aldridge (2) |
| 7 April 1992 | Portsmouth | H | 2–0 | 6,692 | Irons, Thomas |
| 10 April 1992 | Middlesbrough | H | 1–2 | 8,842 | Muir |
| 15 April 1992 | Leicester City | A | 0–1 | 18,555 | |
| 18 April 1992 | Barnsley | A | 1–1 | 5,811 | Muir |
| 20 April 1992 | Blackburn Rovers | H | 2–2 | 13,705 | Irons, Muir |
| 25 April 1992 | Southend United | A | 1–1 | 4,761 | Irons |
| 28 April 1992 | Charlton Athletic | A | 1–0 | 7,645 | Aldridge |
| 2 May 1992 | Oxford United | H | 1–2 | 9,173 | Aldridge |

=== FA Cup ===
| Round | Date | Opponent | Venue | Result | Attendance | Goalscorers |
|---|---|---|---|---|---|---|
| R1 | 16 November 1991 | Runcorn | H | 3–0 | 6,565 | Irons, Aldridge (2) |
| R2 | 7 December 1991 | York City | A | 1–1 | 4,646 | Morrissey |
| R2R | 17 December 1991 | York City | H | 2–1 | 5,546 | Irons, Aldridge |
| R3 | 4 January 1992 | Oxford United | A | 1–3 | 6,027 | Malkin |

=== Rumbelows Cup ===
| Round | Date | Opponent | Venue | Result | Attendance | Goalscorers |
|---|---|---|---|---|---|---|
| R1 1st Leg | 20 August 1991 | Halifax Town | A | 4–3 | 1,910 | Irons, Aldridge (3) |
| R1 2nd Leg | 27 August 1991 | Halifax Town | H | 4–3 (won 8–6 on agg) | 4,285 | Aldridge (2), Steel (2) |
| R2 1st Leg | 25 September 1991 | Chelsea | A | 1–1 | 11,311 | Aldridge 52' |
| R2 2nd Leg | 8 October 1991 | Chelsea | H | 3–1 a.e.t. (won 4–2 on agg) | 11,165 | Steel 36', Aldridge (pen) 116', Malkin 118' |
| R3 | 29 October 1991 | Leeds United | A | 1–3 | 18,266 | Aldridge |

=== Zenith Data Systems Cup ===
| Round | Date | Opponent | Venue | Result | Attendance | Goalscorers |
|---|---|---|---|---|---|---|
| NR1 | 2 October 1991 | Newcastle United | H | 6–6 (won 3–2 on pens) | 4,056 | McNab 8', Aldridge 19', 94', pen 120', Steel 76', Martindale 96' |
| NR2 | 22 October 1991 | Grimsby Town | H | 5–1 | 4,053 | Aldridge (3), Steel, Martindale |
| NQF | 26 November 1991 | Middlesbrough | A | 1–0 | 6,952 | Aldridge |
| NSF | 10 December 1991 | Nottingham Forest | H | 0–2 | 8,034 | |

== Squad ==
Note: Flags indicate national team as defined under FIFA eligibility rules; some limited exceptions apply. Players may hold more than one non-FIFA nationality.

| Pos. | Nation | Player |
|---|---|---|
| GK | ENG | Paul Collings |
| GK | ENG | Eric Nixon |
| DF | ENG | Shaun Garnett |
| DF | ENG | Dave Higgins |
| DF | WAL | Mark Hughes |
| DF | ENG | John McGreal |
| DF | SCO | Steve Mungall |
| DF | NIR | Ian Nolan |
| DF | ENG | Tony Thomas |
| DF | ENG | Steve Vickers |
| MF | ENG | Graham Branch |
| MF | ENG | Ged Brannan |

| Pos. | Nation | Player |
|---|---|---|
| MF | NIR | Jim Harvey |
| MF | ENG | Kenny Irons |
| MF | ENG | Dave Martindale |
| MF | SCO | Neil McNab |
| MF | ENG | John Morrissey |
| MF | SCO | Pat Nevin |
| FW | IRL | John Aldridge |
| FW | ENG | Steve Cooper |
| FW | ENG | Chris Malkin |
| FW | ENG | Ian Muir |
| FW | SCO | Jim Steel |
