= Harry Lyon =

Harry Lyon may refer to:

- Harry Lyon (musician), New Zealand musician
- Harry Lyon (aviator), United States pioneer aviator
- Harry Lyon (footballer) (died 1984), English football player

== See also ==
- Harry Lyons (disambiguation)
- Henry Lyon (disambiguation)
