= 1952–53 Everton F.C. season =

English football club season

Everton
1952–53 season
- Manager: Cliff Britton
- Ground: Goodison Park
- Second Division: 16th
- FA Cup: Semi-Final
- Top goalscorer: League: Tommy Eglington (14); All: John Willie Parker (17)
Home colours	Away colours

During the 1952–53 English football season, Everton F.C. competed in the Football League Second Division. The season was notable as Everton's lowest ever finish in the English Football pyramid.

== Final league table ==
Pos	Team	Pld	W	D	L	GF	GA	GAv	Pts
14	West Ham United	42	13	13	16	58	60	0.967	39
15	Lincoln City	42	11	17	14	64	71	0.901	39
16	Everton	42	12	14	16	71	75	0.947	38
17	Brentford	42	13	11	18	59	76	0.776	37
18	Hull City	42	14	8	20	57	69	0.826	36

Rules for classification: 1) Points; 2) Goal average; 3) Goals scored

== Results ==
Win	Draw	Loss

=== Football League Second Division ===
Date	Opponent	Venue	Result	Attendance	Scorers
23 August 1952	Hull City	H	0–2	43,035	
25 August 1952	Sheffield United	A	0–1	30,625	
30 August 1952	Blackburn Rovers	A	1–3	27,134	
3 September 1952	Sheffield United	H	0–0	31,554	
6 September 1952	Nottingham Forest	H	3–0	34,254	
10 September 1952	Barnsley	A	3–2	10,835	
13 September 1952	Southampton	A	1–1	18,021	
20 September 1952	Brentford	A	4–2	21,042	
27 September 1952	Doncaster Rovers	H	7–1	34,344	
4 October 1952	Swansea City	A	2–2	22,954	
11 October 1952	Notts County	H	1–0	40,626	
18 October 1952	Leicester City	A	2–4	36,819	
25 October 1952	West Ham United	H	2–0	38,323	
1 November 1952	Fulham	A	0–3	26,775	
8 November 1952	Rotherham United	H	0–1	38,808	
15 November 1952	Plymouth Argyle	A	0–1	24,960	
22 November 1952	Leeds United	H	2–2	28,664	
29 November 1952	Luton Town	A	2–4	15,160	
6 December 1953	Birmingham City	H	1–1	23,858	
13 December 1952	Bury	A	5–0	12,549	
20 December 1952	Hull City	A	0–1	15,708	
26 December 1952	Lincoln City	A	1–1	19,524	
1 January 1953	Barnsley	H	2–1	25,485	
3 January 1953	Blackburn Rovers	H	0–3	37,137	
17 January 1953	Nottingham Forest	A	3–3	22,298	
24 January 1953	Southampton	H	2–2	25,278	
7 February 1953	Brentford	H	5–0	36,431	
18 February 1953	Doncaster Rovers	A	0–3	8,951	
21 February 1953	Swansea Town	H	0–0	39,618	
5 March 1953	Notts County	A	2–2	7,529	
7 March 1953	Leicester City	H	2–2	41,005	
14 March 1953	West Ham United	A	1–3	19,022	
25 March 1953	Fulham	H	3–3	10,829	
28 March 1953	Rotherham United	A	2–2	12,633	
4 April 1953	Plymouth Argyle	H	2–0	38,794	
6 April 1953	Huddersfield Town	H	2–1	48,221	
7 April 1953	Huddersfield Town	A	2–8	30,721	
11 April 1953	Leeds United	A	0–2	15,363	
15 April 1953	Bury	H	3–0	11,787	
18 April 1953	Luton Town	H	1–1	32,948	
22 April 1953	Lincoln City	H	0–3	24,217	
25 April 1953	Birmingham City	A	2–4	17,083	

=== FA Cup ===
Round	Date	Opponent	Venue	Result	Attendance	Goalscorers
3	10 January 1953	Ipswich Town	H	3–2	42,252	
4	31 January 1953	Nottingham Forest	H	4–1	48,904	
5	21 February 1953	Manchester United	H	2–1	77,920	
6	28 February 1953	Aston Villa	A	1–0	60,658	
SF	21 March 1953	Bolton Wanderers	N	3–4	75,213	
