= Henry Lyon =

Henry Lyon may refer to:

- Henry H. Lyon (1879–1917), member of the California State Legislature
- Hank Lyon, American politician in New Jersey
- Henry Lyon, father of Emma, Lady Hamilton

== See also ==
- Harry Lyon (disambiguation)
- Henry Lyons (disambiguation)
