= Harold Lyons =

Harold Lyons may refer to:

- Harold Lyons, member of Project Space Track
- Harold Lyons, candidate for Manchester Council election, 2002
- Harold Lyons, see Timeline of time measurement technology

== See also ==
- Harry Lyons (disambiguation)
