= Henry Lyons (disambiguation) =

Henry Lyons (1942–2025) was an American Protestant pastor and President of the National Baptist Convention from 1994 to 1999.

Henry Lyons may also refer to:

- Henry A. Lyons (1809–1872), second Chief Justice of the California Supreme Court
- Sir Henry George Lyons (1864–1944), geologist and director of the Science Museum in London
- Henry Lyons, 1st Baron Ennisdale (1877–1963), British soldier, politician and businessman

== See also ==
- Harry Lyons (disambiguation)
- Henry Lyon (disambiguation)
