= Harry Lyons =

Harry Lyons may refer to:

- Harry Lyons (baseball) (1866–1912), American baseball outfielder
- Harry Lyons (politician) (1900–1962), politician in the Canadian province of Ontario
- Harry Agar Lyons (1878–1944), Irish-born British actor
- Harry Lyons, member of California's 64th State Assembly district
- Harry Lyons, character in Algie the Miner

== See also ==
- Harry Leons (born 1974), American football player
- Harry Lyon (disambiguation)
- Henry Lyons (disambiguation)
- Harold Lyons (disambiguation)
