= 1962–63 Tranmere Rovers F.C. season =

Tranmere Rovers F.C.
1962–63 season
- Manager: Dave Russell
- Stadium: Prenton Park
- Fourth Division: 8th
- FA Cup: Third Round
- League Cup: First Round
Team colours

Tranmere Rovers F.C. played the 1962–63 season in the Football League Fourth Division, where they finished 8th of 24. They reached the Third Round of the FA Cup, and the First Round of the League Cup.

== Football League ==
Pos	Team	Pld	W	D	L	GF	GA	GAv	Pts
6	Torquay United	46	20	16	10	75	56	1.339	56
7	Rochdale	46	20	11	15	67	59	1.136	51
8	Tranmere Rovers	46	20	10	16	81	67	1.209	50
9	Barrow	46	19	12	15	82	80	1.025	50
10	Workington	46	17	13	16	76	68	1.118	47

Source: rsssf.com
