= 1951–52 Everton F.C. season =

English football club season

Everton
1951–52 season
- Manager: Cliff Britton
- Ground: Goodison Park
- Second Division: 7th
- FA Cup: Third Round
- Top goalscorer: League: John Willie Parker (15); All: John Willie Parker (16)
Home colours

During the 1951–52 English football season, Everton F.C. competed in the Football League Second Division.

== Final league table ==
| Pos | Team | Pld | W | D | L | GF | GA | GAv | Pts |
|---|---|---|---|---|---|---|---|---|---|
| 5 | Leicester City | 42 | 19 | 9 | 14 | 78 | 64 | 1.219 | 47 |
| 6 | Leeds United | 42 | 18 | 11 | 13 | 59 | 57 | 1.035 | 47 |
| 7 | Everton | 42 | 17 | 10 | 15 | 64 | 58 | 1.103 | 44 |
| 8 | Luton Town | 42 | 16 | 12 | 14 | 77 | 78 | 0.987 | 44 |
| 9 | Rotherham United | 42 | 17 | 8 | 17 | 73 | 71 | 1.028 | 42 |

Rules for classification: 1) Points; 2) Goal average; 3) Goals scored

== Results ==
| Win | Draw | Loss |

=== Football League Second Division ===
| Date | Opponent | Venue | Result | Attendance | Scorers |
|---|---|---|---|---|---|
| 18 August 1951 | Southampton | A | 0–1 | | |
| 22 August 1951 | Brentford | H | 1–0 | | |
| 25 August 1951 | Sheffield Wednesday | H | 3–3 | | |
| 27 August 1951 | Brentford | A | 0–1 | | |
| 1 September 1951 | Leeds United | A | 2–1 | | |
| 5 September 1951 | Nottingham Forest | H | 1–0 | | |
| 8 September 1951 | Rotherham United | H | 3–3 | | |
| 12 September 1951 | Nottingham Forest | A | 0–2 | | |
| 15 September 1951 | Cardiff City | A | 1–3 | | |
| 22 September 1951 | Birmingham City | H | 1–3 | | |
| 29 September 1951 | Leicester City | A | 2–1 | | |
| 6 October 1951 | Blackburn Rovers | H | 0–2 | | |
| 13 October 1951 | Queen’s Park Rangers | A | 4–4 | | |
| 20 October 1951 | Notts County | H | 1–5 | | |
| 27 October 1951 | Luton Town | A | 1–1 | | |
| 3 November 1951 | Bury | H | 2–2 | | |
| 10 November 1951 | Swansea Town | A | 2–0 | | |
| 17 November 1951 | Coventry City | H | 4–1 | | |
| 24 November 1951 | West Ham United | A | 3–3 | | |
| 1 December 1951 | Sheffield United | H | 1–0 | | |
| 8 December 1951 | Barnsley | A | 0–1 | | |
| 15 December 1951 | Southampton | H | 3–0 | | |
| 22 December 1951 | Sheffield Wednesday | A | 0–4 | | |
| 25 December 1951 | Doncaster Rovers | A | 1–3 | | |
| 26 December 1951 | Doncaster Rovers | H | 1–1 | | |
| 29 December 1951 | Leeds United | H | 2–0 | | |
| 5 January 1952 | Rotherham United | A | 1–1 | | |
| 19 January 1952 | Cardiff City | H | 3–0 | | |
| 26 January 1952 | Birmingham City | A | 2–1 | | |
| 9 February 1952 | Leicester City | H | 2–0 | | |
| 16 February 1952 | Blackburn Rovers | A | 0–1 | | |
| 1 March 1952 | Queen’s Park Rangers | H | 3–0 | | |
| 8 March 1952 | Notts County | A | 0–0 | | |
| 15 March 1952 | Luton Town | H | 1–3 | | |
| 22 March 1952 | Bury | A | 0–1 | | |
| 29 March 1952 | Swansea Town | H | 2–1 | | |
| 5 April 1952 | Coventry City | A | 1–2 | | |
| 11 April 1952 | Hull City | H | 5–0 | | |
| 12 April 1952 | West Ham United | H | 2–0 | | |
| 14 April 1952 | Hull City | A | 0–1 | | |
| 19 April 1952 | Sheffield United | A | 2–1 | | |
| 26 April 1952 | Barnsley | H | 1–1 | | |

=== FA Cup ===
| Round | Date | Opponent | Venue | Result | Attendance | Goalscorers |
|---|---|---|---|---|---|---|
| 3 | 12 January 1952 | Leyton Orient | A | 0–0 | | |
| 3:R | 16 January 1952 | Leyton Orient | H | 1–3 | | |
