= 1953–54 Everton F.C. season =

English football club season

Everton
1953–54 season
- Manager: Cliff Britton
- Ground: Goodison Park
- Second Division: 2nd (Promoted)
- FA Cup: Fifth Round
- Top goalscorer: League: John Willie Parker (31); All: John Willie Parker (33)
Home colours	Away colours	Third colours

During the 1953–54 English football season, Everton F.C. competed in the Football League Second Division.

== Final league table ==
Pos	Team	Pld	W	D	L	GF	GA	GAv	Pts	Qualification or relegation
1	Leicester City (C, P)	42	23	10	9	97	60	1.617	56	Promotion to the First Division
2	Everton (P)	42	20	16	6	92	58	1.586	56	Promotion to the First Division
3	Blackburn Rovers	42	23	9	10	86	50	1.720	55	
4	Nottingham Forest	42	20	12	10	86	59	1.458	52	
5	Rotherham United	42	21	7	14	80	67	1.194	49	

Rules for classification: 1) Points; 2) Goal average; 3) Goals scored
(C) Champions; (P) Promoted

== Results ==
Win	Draw	Loss

=== Football League Second Division ===
Date	Opponent	Venue	Result	Attendance	Scorers
19 August 1953	Nottingham Forest	A	3–3 (1–2)	21,669	Parker 24', 75', Eglington 77'
22 August 1953	Luton Town	A	1–1 (0–1)	20,217	Buckle 65'
24 August 1953	Hull City	A	3–1 (3–0)	26,511	Parker 5', Hickson 10', Fielding 31'
29 August 1953	Oldham Athletic	H	3–1 (0–0)	45,923	Parker 55', 60', 67'
2 September 1953	Hull City	H	2–0 (1–0)	35,126	Fielding 43', Buckle 84'
5 September 1953	Bury	A	2–2 (1–2)	17,650	Eglington 26', Parker 63'
10 September 1953	Notts County	A	2–0 (1–0)	12,515	Parker 35', McNamara 78'
12 September 1953	Doncaster Rovers	H	4–1 (1–1)	58,110	Eglington 42', 51'. Parker 60', 84'
19 September 1953	Blackburn Rovers	A	0–0 (0–0)	32,177	-
23 September 1953	Notts County	H	3–2 (1–1)	32,005	Hickson 35', 54', Eglington 65'
26 September 1953	Derby County	H	3–2 (2–1)	54,216	Eglington 34', Lello 35', Parker 48'
3 October 1953	Brentford	A	0–1 (0–0)	17,367	-
10 October 1953	Plymouth Argyle	A	0–4 (0–2)	26,342	-
17 October 1953	Swansea Town	H	2–2 (1–0)	48,644	Parker 14', 50'
24 October 1953	Rotherham United	A	2–1 (1–0)	18,860	Hickson 25', Fielding 55'
31 October 1953	Leicester City	H	1–2 (0–1)	51,811	Eglington 65'
7 November 1953	Stoke City	A	4–2 (2–1)	18,653	Hickson 3', 35', 75', Parker 30'
14 November 1953	Fulham	H	2–2 (0–1)	36,092	Parker, 56', Hickson 80'
21 November 1953	West Ham United	A	1–1 (0–0)	24,515	Lewis 60'
28 November 1953	Leeds United	H	2–1 (1–1)	55,970	Hickson 14', Buckle 81'
5 December 1953	Birmingham City	A	1–5 (0–0)	23,557	Parker 59'
12 December 1953	Nottingham Forest	H	3–3 (3–2)	33,192	Hickson 10', 35', Parker 13'
19 December 1953	Luton Town	H	2–1 (0–1)	33,544	Parker 47', Eglington 75'
25 December 1953	Bristol Rovers	H	4–2 (?-?)	27,484	Wainwright 41', Hickson (2), Eglington
28 December 1953	Bristol Rovers	A	0–0 (0–0)	34,013	-
16 January 1954	Bury	H	0–0 (0–0)	33,705	-
23 January 1954	Doncaster Rovers	A	2–2 (0–2)	21,203	Wainwright 79', Hickson 80'
6 February 1954	Blackburn Rovers	H	1–1 (1–1)	56,434	Hickson 35'
13 February 1954	Derby County	A	6–2 (0–1)	16,444	Hickson 56', Lindsay 58' (pen), Wainwright 61', 77', 86', Parker 88'
24 February 1954	Brentford	H	6–1 (?-0)	23,145	Parker 1'. ??', Fielding 18', Wainwright 25', Hickson 55', ??'
27 February 1954	Plymouth Argyle	H	8–4 (3–2)	44,496	Lello 5', Parker 16', 55', 75', 83' Lindsay 43' (pen), Hickson 68', 69'
6 March 1954	Swansea Town	A	2–0 (0–0)	20,902	Parker 46', Hickson 80'
13 March 1954	Rotherham United	H	3–0 (0–0)	52,302	Parker 75', 80', 89'
20 March 1954	Leicester City	A	2–2 (1–2)	39,046	Jackson (og) 10', Hickson 75'
27 March 1954	West Ham United	H	1–2 (?-1)	41,653	Wainwright
3 April 1954	Leeds United	A	1–3 (1–1)	22,581	Wainwright 43'
10 April 1954	Stoke City	H	1–1 (0–1)	46,411	Eglington 78'
16 April 1954	Lincoln City	H	3–1 (0–1)	61,231	Farrell 52', Fielding 73', Lewis ??
17 April 1954	Fulham	A	0–0 (0–0)	33,517	-
19 April 1954	Lincoln City	A	1–1 (1–0)	17,593	Eglington 40'
24 April 1954	Birmingham City	H	1–0 (1–0)	62,865	Hickson 38'
29 April 1954	Oldham Athletic	A	4–0 (4–0)	30,072	Parker 7', 26', Jones 17', Hickson 36'

=== FA Cup ===
Round	Date	Opponent	Venue	Result	Attendance	Goalscorers
3	9 January 1954	Notts County	H	2–1 (1–1)	49,737	Eglington 17', Hickson 89'
4	30 January 1954	Swansea Town	H	3–0 (2–0)	61,619	Parker 20', 31', Hickson 90'
5	20 February 1954	Sheffield Wednesday	A	1–3 (1–0)	65,000	Hickson 57'
