= 1954–55 Everton F.C. season =

English football club season

Everton
1954–55 season
- Manager: Cliff Britton
- Ground: Goodison Park
- First Division: 11th
- FA Cup: Fourth Round
- Top goalscorer: League: John Willie Parker (19); All: John Willie Parker (19)
Home colours	Away colours	Third colours

During the 1954–55 English football season, Everton F.C. competed in the Football League First Division. The team finished eleventh.

== Final league table ==
Pos	Team	Pld	W	D	L	GF	GA	GAv	Pts
9	Arsenal	42	17	9	16	69	63	1.095	43
10	Burnley	42	17	9	16	51	48	1.063	43
11	Everton	42	16	10	16	62	68	0.912	42
12	Huddersfield Town	42	14	13	15	63	68	0.926	41
13	Sheffield United	42	17	7	18	70	86	0.814	41

Source: World Football
Rules for classification: 1) Points; 2) Goal average; 3) Goals scored

== Results ==
Win	Draw	Loss

=== Football League First Division ===
Date	Opponent	Venue	Result	Attendance	Scorers
21 August 1954	Sheffield United	A	5–2	32,913	
25 August 1954	Arsenal	H	1–0	69,034	
28 August 1954	Preston North End	H	1–0	76,839	
31 August 1954	Arsenal	A	0–2	42,146	
4 September 1954	Burnley	A	2–0	31,963	
8 September 1954	West Bromwich Albion	H	1–2	55,197	
11 September 1954	Leicester City	H	2–2	49,684	
15 September 1954	West Bromwich Albion	A	3–3	40,442	
18 September 1954	Chelsea	A	2–0	59,199	
25 September 1954	Cardiff City	H	1–1	54,248	
2 October 1954	Manchester City	A	0–1	45,737	
9 October 1954	Aston Villa	A	2–0	30,702	
16 October 1954	Sunderland	H	1–0	61,189	
23 October 1954	Huddersfield Town	A	1–2	27,390	
30 October 1954	Manchester United	H	4–2	63,021	
6 November 1954	Portsmouth	A	0–5	32,402	
13 November 1954	Blackpool	H	0–1	57,137	
20 November 1954	Charlton Athletic	A	0–5	20,387	
27 November 1954	Bolton Wanderers	H	0–0	43,681	
4 December 1954	Tottenham Hotspur	A	3–1	31,554	
11 December 1954	Sheffield Wednesday	H	3–1	36,849	
18 December 1954	Sheffield United	H	2–3	35,088	
25 December 1954	Wolverhampton Wanderers	A	3–1	28,494	
27 December 1954	Wolverhampton Wanderers	H	3–2	75,322	
1 January 1955	Preston North End	A	0–0	33,881	
15 January 1955	Burnley	H	1–1	29,520	
5 February 1955	Chelsea	H	1–1	50,658	
12 February 1955	Cardiff City	A	3–4	17,108	
23 February 1955	Manchester City	H	1–0	20,457	
5 March 1955	Sheffield Wednesday	A	2–2	21,716	
19 March 1955	Manchester United	A	2–1	34,152	
23 March 1955	Huddersfield Town	H	4–0	15,561	
26 March 1955	Portsmouth	H	2–3	30,087	
2 April 1955	Blackpool	A	0–4	19,269	
8 April 1955	Newcastle United	H	1–2	60,068	
9 April 1955	Tottenham Hotspur	H	1–0	42,219	
11 April 1955	Newcastle United	A	0–4	45,329	
16 April 1955	Bolton Wanderers	A	0–2	26,722	
20 April 1955	Leicester City	A	2–2	21,122	
23 April 1955	Charlton Athletic F.C.	H	2–2	27,969	
30 April 1955	Sunderland	A	0–3	20,989	
4 May 1955	Aston Villa	H	0–1	20,503	

=== FA Cup ===
Round	Date	Opponent	Venue	Result	Attendance	Goalscorers
3	8 January 1955	Southend United	H	3–1	53,043	
4	29 January 1955	Liverpool	H	0–4	75,000	
