= 1975–76 Tranmere Rovers F.C. season =

Tranmere Rovers F.C.
1975–76 season
- Manager: John King
- Stadium: Prenton Park
- Football League Fourth Division: 4th (of 24)
Team colours

Tranmere Rovers F.C. regained Third Division status at the first attempt in 1975–76. John King replaced Ron Yeats as manager and Ronnie Moore was switched to attack with great success, scoring as Tranmere started with a 1–1 draw at Swansea City. They rose to the top of the table after winning nine times in eleven games, including beating Torquay United 7–1 and Workington 6–0. John James was signed from Chester City, then Clive Griffiths arrived from Manchester United as Rovers remained in the promotion race. Moore scored four times against Brentford, Stockport County and Newport County in quick succession, scoring a total of 34 goals as Tranmere finished fourth.

== Final league table ==
Pos	Team	Pld	W	D	L	GF	GA	GAv	Pts	Promotion
2	Northampton Town	46	29	10	7	87	40	2.175	68	Promoted
3	Reading	46	24	12	10	70	51	1.373	60	Promoted
4	Tranmere Rovers	46	24	10	12	89	55	1.618	58	Promoted
5	Huddersfield Town	46	21	14	11	56	41	1.366	56	
6	AFC Bournemouth	46	20	12	14	57	48	1.188	52	
