= 1966–67 Tranmere Rovers F.C. season =

Tranmere Rovers F.C.
1966–67 season
- Chairman: Fred C. Lloyd
- Manager: Dave Russell
- Stadium: Prenton Park
- Football League Fourth Division: 4th (of 24)
- Top goalscorer: League: Yardley (15); All: Yardley (16)
- Highest home attendance: 15,555 vs Southport (28 April 1967)
- Lowest home attendance: 3,495 vs Exeter City (3 September 1966)
- Average home league attendance: 7,839
Team colours

Dave Russell managed Tranmere Rovers F.C. to promotion in 1966–67. Tranmere had narrowly failed to win promotion in the previous two years and newcomers included Barry Ashworth and Graham Williams, while young players Jim Cumbes and Roy McFarland established regular first-team slots. Rovers were early pace-setters after losing just one of their first 15 games, including a 5–0 victory over Crewe Alexandra. George Yardley was signed from Luton Town, then George Hudson arrived from Northampton. Four successive wins maintained Tranmere's promotion challenge and they finished fourth after losing only two of their last 12 games.

== Final league table ==
Pos	Team	Pld	W	D	L	GF	GA	GAv	Pts	Promotion or relegation
2	Southport	46	23	13	10	69	42	1.643	59	Promoted
3	Barrow	46	24	11	11	76	54	1.407	59	Promoted
4	Tranmere Rovers	46	22	14	10	66	43	1.535	58	Promoted
5	Crewe Alexandra	46	21	12	13	70	55	1.273	54	
6	Southend United	46	22	9	15	70	49	1.429	53	

Source: rsssf.com
