= Ray Smith (footballer, born 1934) =

English footballer (1934–2024)

Personal information
- Full name: Harold Raymond Smith
- Date of birth: 13 September 1934
- Place of birth: Hull, England
- Date of death: 21 November 2024 (aged 90)
- Place of death: Peterborough, England
- Position: Inside forward

Youth career
- Hull City

Senior career*
Years	Team	Apps	(Gls)
1952–1956	Hull City	23	(2)
1956–1962	Peterborough United	207	(108)
1962–1963	Northampton Town	23	(7)
1963–1964	Luton Town	10	(1)
Total		263	(118)
- * Club domestic league appearances and goals

Harold Raymond Smith (13 September 1934 – 21 November 2024) was an English footballer who played as an inside forward. He scored 43 goals from 148 appearances in the Football League playing for Hull City, Peterborough United, Northampton Town and Luton Town. Smith also scored 75 goals from 115 appearances in the Midland League for Peterborough before their admission to the Football League in 1960.

Smith died at a hospital in Peterborough, on 21 November 2024, at the age of 90.
