= Arnold Woollard =

Bermudian footballer (1930–2023)

Personal information
- Full name: Arnold James Woollard
- Date of birth: 24 August 1930
- Place of birth: Pembroke, Bermuda
- Date of death: October 2023 (aged 93)
- Position: Defender

Senior career*
Years	Team	Apps	(Gls)
–1949	Bermuda Athletic Association		
1949–1952	Northampton Town		
1952–1953	Peterborough United	18	(0)
1953–1956	Newcastle United	10	(0)
1956–1962	Bournemouth & Boscombe Athletic	161	
1962–1963	Northampton Town	31	
1963–1967	Bermuda Athletic Association		

International career
1964	Bermuda	1	(0)
- * Club domestic league appearances and goals

Arnold James Woollard (24 August 1930 – October 2023) was a Bermudian footballer who played as a defender. He spent most of his career in England and was the first ever professional footballer from Bermuda.

== Early life ==
Born in Pembroke, Woollard spent his early childhood in St. George's, before returning to Pembroke and later attending Warwick Academy in Warwick.

== Club career ==
In 1949, Woollard was spotted by Northampton Town director Phillip Hutton, who was visiting the country at the time, and later signed him for the club in August 1949. While there, Northampton's coaches switched him to the full-back position. In his first season with the club, he helped them reach the fifth round proper of the 1949–50 FA Cup, where they were eliminated by Derby County.

In 1952, he joined Midland Football League side Peterborough United, where he played 25 matches, including seven in the FA Cup as they reached the second round. Following his performance in the FA Cup, his manager Jack Fairbrother alerted his former club, First Division side Newcastle United, about Wollard, with the club signing him after only half a season for £4,000, which at the time was Peterborough United's record sale.

Woollard made his Newcastle United debut on 18 April 1953, in a match against Portsmouth, however he was not a regular starter at the club, primarily acting as a backup to Frank Brennan and Bobby Cowell. Despite only playing 10 matches overall for the club, he was part of the club's 1954–55 FA Cup winning side, only missing the final after suffering an eye injury in a match against Fulham. At the end of the 1955–56 season he was sold to Third Division South side Bournemouth & Boscombe Athletic for £2000, becoming the club's record signing.

In his first season at Bournemouth & Boscombe Athletic, he was part of another notable FA Cup run, this time seeing his side beat the likes of Wolverhampton Wanderers and Tottenham Hotspur, before being eliminated by Manchester United in the sixth round, following a controversial penalty call. In total, he made 161 appearances for Bournemouth & Boscombe Athletic.

In March 1962, he returned to Northampton Town in a swap deal for winger Ron Spelman. He made 31 appearances for them, helping them win the 1962–63 Third Division in his final season at the club, before returning to Bermuda,where he worked for Butterfield Bank while continuing to play football for the Bermuda Athletic Association until his retirement in 1967.

== International career ==
In 1964, Woollard played in the first ever Bermuda national team match, being a 4–3 defeat against Iceland in Reykjavík.

== Personal life and death ==
Wollard had five siblings, including two brothers and three sisters. In 1988, he moved back to England after spending 25 years in Bermuda. In 2006, he was inducted into the Bermuda Sports Hall of Fame.

Wollard died in October 2023, at the age of 93. He is survived by his wife.
