= 1990–91 Tranmere Rovers F.C. season =

Tranmere Rovers F.C.
1990–91 season
- Manager: John King
- Stadium: Prenton Park
- Football League Third Division: 5th (of 24)
Team colours

Tranmere Rovers F.C. won the Third Division play-off final in 1990–91. John King's side lost only two of their first twelve games, with Eddie Bishop scoring a hat-trick over Mansfield Town. After a period of inconsistent form, the re-entered the promotion places with six successive wins. They qualified for the play-offs in fifth position after winning four of their last five matches. Tranmere defeated Brentford 3–2, then beat Bolton Wanderers 1–0 after extra time in the final. They defeated Rotherham United 3–0, Blackpool 2–0, Wigan Athletic 3–0 and Preston North End 4–1 in the Leyland DAF Cup before losing to Birmingham City in the final at Wembley Stadium.

== Final league table ==
Pos	Team	Pld	W	D	L	GF	GA	GD	Pts	Promotion or relegation
3	Grimsby Town	46	24	11	11	66	34	+32	83	Promoted
4	Bolton Wanderers	46	24	11	11	64	50	+14	83	Participated in play-offs
5	Tranmere Rovers	46	23	9	14	64	46	+18	78	Promoted through play-offs (Note: Tranmere Rovers won the play-offs and were promoted.)
6	Brentford	46	21	13	12	59	47	+12	76	Participated in play-offs
7	Bury	46	20	13	13	67	56	+11	73	Participated in play-offs
