= Paul Collings =

English footballer

Personal information
- Date of birth: 30 September 1968 (age 58)
- Place of birth: Liverpool, England
- Position: Goalkeeper

Senior career*
| Years | Team | Apps | (Gls) |
- Ellesmere Port
| 1988–1991 | Tranmere Rovers | 4 | (0) |
| 1992–1993 | Accrington Stanley | | |
| 1993–1994 | Bury | 1 | (0) |
- Altrincham
| Total | | 5 | (0) |
- * Club domestic league appearances and goals

Paul Collings (born 30 September 1968) is an English former footballer who played as a goalkeeper. He represented Tranmere Rovers and Bury in the Football League, and also played for Ellesmere Port, Bury and Altrincham.
