= Roy Jennings (footballer) =

English footballer and manager

Personal information
- Full name: Roy Thomas Edward Jennings
- Date of birth: 31 December 1931
- Place of birth: Swindon, England
- Date of death: 21 October 2016 (aged 84)
- Place of death: Crawley, England
- Position: Centre half

Youth career
- Swindon Town
- Southampton

Senior career*
Years	Team	Apps	(Gls)
1952–1964	Brighton & Hove Albion	276	(22)
1964–1969	Crawley Town	156	
Total		432	(22+)

International career
- England youth

Managerial career
- 1968–1970: Crawley Town
- * Club domestic league appearances and goals

Roy Thomas Edward Jennings (31 December 1931 – 21 October 2016) was an English professional football player and manager.

He played as a centre half for Swindon Town, Southampton, Brighton & Hove Albion, and Crawley Town, making over 500 career appearances. He also managed Crawley Town for two years.

== Career ==
Born in Swindon, Jennings initially played for Swindon Town as an amateur. While at Swindon he represented Wiltshire and also England youth. While studying accountancy he was spotted by a scout for Southampton, playing for them as an amateur.

Jennings signed for Brighton & Hove Albion in May 1952. Initially a full back, he primarily played for Brighton as a centre half. He scored 22 goals in 276 League appearances, and 22 goals in 297 appearances for the club in all competitions. 13 of his goals were penalties. At Brighton he was known for as "a firm fans' favourite due to his strong aerial presence and physical style of play." He won promotion with the club to the old Second Division.

Jennings joined Crawley Town on a free transfer in 1964, after being released by Brighton. He scored 38 goals for Crawley, all penalties, in 220 appearances in all competitions. 156 of his appearances were in the league. He made his last appearance for Crawley in 1969. He also managed the club between 1968 and 1970. He was the club's third ever manager, and won promotion to the Southern League Premier Division in 1969.

After retiring from football, Jennings remained in Crawley, and became a partner in an accountancy firm, and also served as a magistrate.

He died on 21 October 2016, at the age of 84.
