= 1989–90 Tranmere Rovers F.C. season =

Tranmere Rovers F.C.
1989–90 season
- Manager: John King
- Stadium: Prenton Park
- Football League Third Division: 4th (of 24)
Team colours

John King guided Tranmere Rovers F.C to Leyland DAF Cup victory in 1989–90. Tranmere moved to the top of the Third Division after winning seven of their opening nine games, including a 6–0 victory over Bristol City. They also took Tottenham Hotspur to a Littlewoods Cup fourth round replay. Following a poor spell, they revived their promotion prospects with nine straight wins. Tranmere finished in fourth place, but lost 2–0 to Notts County in the play-off final. They defeated Rochdale 1–0, Scunthorpe United 2–1, Chester City 3–0, Bolton Wanderers 2–1 and Doncaster Rovers 3–1 in the Leyland DAF Cup before beating Bristol Rovers 2–1 in the final at Wembley Stadium.

== Final league table ==
Pos	Team	Pld	W	D	L	GF	GA	GD	Pts	Promotion or relegation
2	Bristol City	46	27	10	9	76	40	+36	91	Promoted
3	Notts County	46	25	12	9	73	53	+20	87	Promoted through play-offs (Note: Notts County were promoted through the play-offs.)
4	Tranmere Rovers	46	23	11	12	86	49	+37	80	Participated in play-offs
5	Bury	46	21	11	14	70	49	+21	74	Participated in play-offs
6	Bolton Wanderers	46	18	15	13	59	48	+11	69	Participated in play-offs
