= Alec Ashworth =

English footballer

Personal information
- Date of birth: 1 October 1939
- Place of birth: Southport, Lancashire, England
- Date of death: 1995 (aged 55–56)
- Position: Inside forward

Youth career
- Everton

Senior career*
Years	Team	Apps	(Gls)
1958–1960	Everton	12	(3)
1960–1962	Luton Town	63	(20)
1962–1963	Northampton Town	30	(25)
1963–1966	Preston North End	43	(14)
Total		148	(62)
- * Club domestic league appearances and goals

Alec Ashworth (1 October 1939 – 1995) was an English professional footballer born in Southport, Lancashire.

Ashworth played as an inside forward and started his career at Everton. He played 12 games for Everton and scored 3 goals. He then moved to Luton Town in 1960 and scored 20 goals in 63 games. His most prolific season was 1962–63 when he played for Northampton Town, scoring 25 goals in only 30 games. He was sold by Northampton to Preston North End for £22,000 making the club a £12,000 profit. Ashworth played out the rest of his career at Preston North End, where he played 43 games between 1963 and 1966 and scored 14 goals. Whilst at Preston he played in the 1964 FA Cup final.

== Honours ==
Preston North End

- FA Cup runner-up: 1963–64
