= 1967–68 Tranmere Rovers F.C. season =

Tranmere Rovers F.C.
1967–68 season
- Chairman: W.Hodgson Esq J.P
- Manager: Dave Russell
- Stadium: Prenton Park
- Football League Third Division: 19th (of 24)
- FA Cup: Fifth Round (eliminated by Everton)
Team colours

In 1967–68, centre forward George Yardley starred as Tranmere Rovers F.C. reached the FA Cup fifth round. Newly promoted Tranmere lost their first three games and future England star Roy McFarland was sold to Derby County. Results improved with Yardley scoring four goals in a 4–1 win over Shrewsbury, then scoring hat-tricks against Colchester United and Swindon Town. George Hudson also scored a hat-trick in Tranmere's 5–1 win over Rochdale in the FA Cup first round; the team went on to beat Bradford Park Avenue 3–2, Huddersfield Town 2–1 and Coventry City 2–0, before losing 2–0 to Everton in a fifth round tie watched by 61,982 at Goodison Park.

== Final league table ==
Pos	Team	Pld	W	D	L	GF	GA	GAv	Pts	Promotion or relegation
17	Northampton Town	46	14	13	19	58	72	0.806	41	
18	Orient	46	12	17	17	46	62	0.742	41	
19	Tranmere Rovers	46	14	12	20	62	74	0.838	40	
20	Mansfield Town	46	12	13	21	51	67	0.761	37	
21	Grimsby Town (R)	46	14	9	23	52	69	0.754	37	Relegation to 1968–69 Fourth Division

Source: rsssf.com
(R) Relegated
