= 1988–89 Tranmere Rovers F.C. season =

Promotion-winning season led by striker Ian Muir

Tranmere Rovers F.C.
1988–89 season
- Manager: John King
- Stadium: Prenton Park
- Football League Fourth Division: 2nd (of 24)
Team colours

Striker Ian Muir scored 21 goals as Tranmere Rovers F.C. won promotion in the 1988–89 season. John King's side failed to win any of their opening four league games, but lost just two of their next eleven matches, whilst also reaching the fourth round of the Littlewoods Cup. The 1–0 victory at Scunthorpe United on New Year's Eve started a run of only two defeats in 21 games that took Tranmere to the top of the Fourth Division with four matches remaining. Ian Muir and Steve Vickers were ever-present as the team finished runners-up.

== Final league table ==
Pos	Team	Pld	W	D	L	GF	GA	GD	Pts	Promotion or relegation
1	Rotherham United (C, P)	46	22	16	8	76	35	+41	82	Promotion to the Third Division
2	Tranmere Rovers (P)	46	21	17	8	62	43	+19	80	Promotion to the Third Division
3	Crewe Alexandra (P)	46	21	15	10	67	48	+19	78	Promotion to the Third Division
4	Scunthorpe United	46	21	14	11	77	57	+20	77	Qualification for the Fourth Division play-offs
5	Scarborough	46	21	14	11	67	52	+15	77	Qualification for the Fourth Division play-offs

(C) Champions; (P) Promoted
