= 1955–56 Everton F.C. season =

English football club season

Everton
1955–56 season
- Manager: Cliff Britton (until 24 February); Committee (until 3 May); Ian Buchan (from 3 May)
- Ground: Goodison Park
- First Division: 15th
- FA Cup: Sixth Round
- Top goalscorer: League: Jimmy Harris (19); All: Jimmy Harris (21)
Home colours	Away colours

During the 1955–56 English football season, Everton F.C. competed in the Football League First Division. The team finished fifteenth.

== Final league table ==
Pos	Team	Pld	W	D	L	GF	GA	GAv	Pts
13	West Bromwich Albion	42	18	5	19	58	70	0.829	41
14	Charlton Athletic	42	17	6	19	75	81	0.926	40
15	Everton	42	15	10	17	55	69	0.797	40
16	Chelsea	42	14	11	17	64	77	0.831	39
17	Cardiff City	42	15	9	18	55	69	0.797	39

Source: World Football
Rules for classification: 1) Points; 2) Goal average; 3) Goals scored

== Results ==
Win	Draw	Loss

=== Football League First Division ===
Date	Opponent	Venue	Result	Attendance	Scorers
20 August 1955	Preston North End	A	0–4		
24 August 1955	West Bromwich Albion	A	0–2		
27 August 1955	Burnley	A	1–0		
31 August 1955	West Bromwich Albion	H	2–0		
3 September 1955	Luton Town	A	0–1		
7 September 1955	Manchester United	A	1–2		
10 September 1955	Charlton Athletic	A	2–0		
14 September 1955	Manchester United	H	4–2		
17 September 1955	Tottenham Hotspur	H	2–1		
24 September 1955	Portsmouth	A	0–1		
1 October 1955	Newcastle United	A	2–1		
8 October 1955	Arsenal	H	1–1		
15 October 1955	Bolton Wanderers	A	1–1		
22 October 1955	Aston Villa	H	2–1		
29 October 1955	Sunderland	A	0–0		
5 November 1955	Huddersfield Town	H	5–2		
12 November 1955	Cardiff City	A	1–3		
19 November 1955	Manchester City	H	1–1		
26 November 1955	Wolverhampton Wanderers	A	0–1		
3 December 1955	Chelsea	H	3–3		
10 December 1955	Blackpool	A	0–4		
17 December 1955	Preston North End	A	1–0		
24 December 1955	Burnley	H	1–1		
26 December 1955	Birmingham City	A	2–6		
27 December 1955	Birmingham City	H	5–1		
31 December 1955	Luton Town	A	2–2		
14 January 1956	Charlton Athletic	H	3–2		
21 January 1956	Tottenham Hotspur	A	1–1		
4 February 1956	Portsmouth	H	0–2		
11 February 1956	Newcastle United	H	0–0		
21 February 1956	Arsenal	A	2–3		
25 February 1956	Bolton Wanderers	H	1–0		
7 March 1956	Manchester City	A	0–3		
10 March 1956	Sunderland	H	1–2		
17 March 1956	Huddersfield Town	A	0–1		
24 March 1956	Cardiff City	H	2–0		
30 March 1956	Sheffield United	H	1–4		
31 March 1956	Aston Villa	A	0–2		
2 April 1956	Sheffield United	A	1–1		
7 April 1956	Wolverhampton Wanderers	H	2–1		
14 April 1956	Chelsea	A	1–6		
21 April 1956	Blackpool	H	1–0		

=== FA Cup ===
Round	Date	Opponent	Venue	Result	Attendance	Goalscorers
3	7 January 1956	Bristol City	H	3–1		
4	28 January 1956	Port Vale	A	3–2	44,278	
5	18 February 1956	Chelsea	H	1–0	61,572	
6	3 March 1956	Manchester City	A	1–2	76,129	
