= 1956–57 Everton F.C. season =

English football club season

Everton
1956–57 season
- Manager: Ian Buchan
- Ground: Goodison Park
- First Division: 15th
- FA Cup: Fifth Round
- Top goalscorer: League: Tony McNamara (10); All: Tony McNamara (10)
| Home colours | Away colours |

During the 1956–57 English football season, Everton F.C. competed in the Football League First Division. The team finished fifteenth.

== Final league table ==
| Pos | Team | Pld | W | D | L | GF | GA | GAv | Pts |
|---|---|---|---|---|---|---|---|---|---|
| 13 | Chelsea | 42 | 13 | 13 | 16 | 73 | 73 | 1.000 | 39 |
| 14 | Sheffield Wednesday | 42 | 16 | 6 | 20 | 82 | 88 | 0.932 | 38 |
| 15 | Everton | 42 | 14 | 10 | 18 | 61 | 79 | 0.772 | 38 |
| 16 | Luton Town | 42 | 14 | 9 | 19 | 58 | 76 | 0.763 | 37 |
| 17 | Newcastle United | 42 | 14 | 8 | 20 | 67 | 87 | 0.770 | 36 |

Source: World Football
Rules for classification: 1) Points; 2) Goal average; 3) Goals scored

== Results ==
| Win | Draw | Loss |

=== Football League First Division ===
| Date | Opponent | Venue | Result | Attendance | Scorers |
|---|---|---|---|---|---|
| 18 August 1956 | Leeds United | A | 1–5 | | |
| 22 August 1956 | Blackpool | H | 2–3 | | |
| 25 August 1956 | Bolton Wanderers | H | 2–2 | | |
| 27 August 1956 | Blackpool | A | 2–5 | | |
| 1 September 1956 | Wolverhampton Wanderers | A | 1–2 | | |
| 3 September 1956 | Burnley | A | 1–2 | | |
| 8 September 1956 | Aston Villa | H | 0–4 | | |
| 12 September 1956 | Burnley | H | 1–0 | | |
| 15 September 1956 | Luton Town | A | 0–2 | | |
| 22 September 1956 | Sunderland | H | 2–1 | | |
| 29 September 1956 | Charlton Athletic | A | 2–1 | | |
| 6 October 1956 | Preston North End | A | 0–0 | | |
| 13 October 1956 | Chelsea | H | 0–3 | | |
| 20 October 1956 | Manchester United | A | 5–2 | | |
| 27 October 1956 | Arsenal | H | 4–0 | | |
| 3 November 1956 | West Bromwich Albion | A | 0–3 | | |
| 10 November 1956 | Portsmouth | H | 2–2 | | |
| 17 November 1956 | Newcastle United | A | 0–0 | | |
| 24 November 1956 | Sheffield Wednesday | H | 1–0 | | |
| 1 December 1956 | Cardiff City | A | 0–1 | | |
| 8 December 1956 | Birmingham City | H | 2–0 | | |
| 15 December 1956 | Leeds United | H | 2–1 | | |
| 25 December 1956 | Tottenham Hotspur | H | 0–6 | | |
| 26 December 1956 | Tottenham Hotspur | A | 1–1 | | |
| 29 December 1956 | Wolverhampton Wanderers | H | 3–1 | | |
| 12 January 1957 | Aston Villa | A | 1–5 | | |
| 19 January 1957 | Luton Town | H | 2–1 | | |
| 2 February 1957 | Sunderland | A | 1–1 | | |
| 9 February 1957 | Charlton Athletic | H | 5–0 | | |
| 23 February 1957 | Arsenal | A | 0–2 | | |
| 27 February 1957 | Preston North End | H | 1–4 | | |
| 6 March 1957 | Manchester United | H | 1–2 | | |
| 9 March 1957 | Birmingham City | A | 3–1 | | |
| 16 March 1957 | West Bromwich Albion | H | 0–1 | | |
| 23 March 1957 | Portsmouth | A | 2–3 | | |
| 30 March 1957 | Newcastle United | H | 2–1 | | |
| 6 April 1957 | Sheffield Wednesday | A | 2–2 | | |
| 13 April 1957 | Cardiff City | H | 0–0 | | |
| 19 April 1957 | Manchester City | A | 4–2 | | |
| 20 April 1957 | Chelsea | A | 1–5 | | |
| 22 April 1957 | Manchester City | H | 1–1 | | |
| 27 April 1957 | Bolton Wanderers | A | 1–1 | | |

=== FA Cup ===
| Round | Date | Opponent | Venue | Result | Attendance | Goalscorers |
|---|---|---|---|---|---|---|
| 3 | 5 January 1957 | Blackburn Rovers | H | 1–0 | 56,293 | |
| 4 | 26 January 1957 | West Ham United | H | 2–1 | 55,245 | |
| 5 | 16 February 1957 | Manchester United | A | 0–1 | 61,803 | |
