= 1959–60 Everton F.C. season =

English football club season

Everton
1959–60 season
- Manager: Johnny Carey
- Ground: Goodison Park
- First Division: 15th
- FA Cup: Third Round
- Top goalscorer: League: Bobby Collins (14); All: Bobby Collins (14)

During the 1959–60 English football season, Everton F.C. competed in the Football League First Division.

== Final League Table ==
Pos	Team	Pld	W	D	L	GF	GA	GAv	Pts
13	Arsenal	42	15	9	18	68	80	0.850	39
14	West Ham United	42	16	6	20	75	91	0.824	38
15	Everton	42	13	11	18	73	78	0.936	37
16	Manchester City	42	17	3	22	78	84	0.929	37
17	Blackburn Rovers	42	16	5	21	60	70	0.857	37

Source: World Football
Rules for classification: 1) Points; 2) Goal average; 3) Goals scored

== Results ==
Win	Draw	Loss

=== Football League First Division ===
Date	Opponent	Venue	Result	Attendance	Scorers
22 August 1959	Luton Town	H	2–2	38,539	
25 August 1959	Burnley	A	2–5	29,165	
29 August 1959	Bolton Wanderers	A	1–2	26,792	
2 September 1959	Burnley	H	1–2	39,416	
5 September 1959	Fulham	H	0–0	31,980	
12 September 1959	Nottingham Forest	A	1–1	26,668	
16 September 1959	Blackburn Rovers	H	2–0	41,813	
19 September 1959	Sheffield Wednesday	H	2–1	37,375	
21 September 1959	Blackburn Rovers	A	1–3	27,012	
26 September 1959	Wolverhampton Wanderers	A	0–2	35,230	
3 October 1959	Arsenal	H	3–1	40,587	
10 October 1959	Leeds United	A	3–3	19,122	
17 October 1959	West Ham United	H	0–1	30,563	
24 October 1959	Chelsea	A	0–1	37,114	
31 October 1959	Leicester City	H	6–1	22,587	
7 November 1959	Newcastle United	A	2–8	23,727	
14 November 1959	Birmingham City	H	5–0	19,172	
21 November 1959	Tottenham Hotspur	A	0–3	39,432	
28 November 1959	Manchester United	H	2–1	46,095	
5 December 1959	Preston North End	A	0–0	24,463	
12 December 1959	West Bromwich Albion	H	2–2	25,769	
19 December 1959	Luton Town	A	1–2	9,799	
26 December 1959	Manchester City	H	2–1	43,351	
28 December 1959	Manchester City	A	0–4	30,580	
2 January 1960	Bolton Wanderers	A	0–1	37,513	
16 January 1960	Fulham	A	0–2	21,226	
23 January 1960	Nottingham Forest	H	6–1	32,279	
6 February 1960	Sheffield Wednesday	A	2–2	33,066	
13 February 1960	Wolverhampton Wanderers	H	0–2	51,135	
20 February 1960	Arsenal	A	1–2	28,702	
27 February 1960	Preston North End	H	4–0	50,990	
5 March 1960	West Ham United	A	2–2	25,029	
12 March 1960	Chelsea	H	6–1	50,963	
19 March 1960	West Bromwich Albion	A	2–6	30,887	
25 March 1960	Newcastle United	H	1–2	54,868	
2 April 1960	Birmingham City	A	2–2	24,872	
9 April 1960	Tottenham Hotspur	H	2–1	57,959	
15 April 1960	Blackpool	H	4–0	65,719	
16 April 1960	Leicester City	A	3–3	22,390	
18 April 1960	Blackpool	A	0–0	25,697	
23 April 1960	Leeds United	H	1–0	37,885	
30 April 1960	Manchester United	A	0–5	43,878	

=== FA Cup ===
Round	Date	Opponent	Venue	Result	Attendance	Goalscorers
3	9 January 1960	Bradford City	A	0–3	23,550	
