= Harry Lyon (footballer) =

English footballer

Harry Lyon (died March 1984) was an English non-league footballer. Clubs he played for include Burscough, Wigan Athletic and Chorley (as player-manager).

For Wigan, he holds the records for most goals in a season (66 in 1964–65) and most goals overall (273).
