= 1958–59 Everton F.C. season =

English football club season

Everton
1958–59 season
- Manager: Ian Buchan (until 25 September); Johnny Carey (from 20 October)
- Ground: Goodison Park
- First Division: 16th
- FA Cup: Fifth Round
- Top goalscorer: League: Dave Hickson (17); All: Dave Hickson (22)

During the 1958–59 English football season, Everton F.C. competed in the Football League First Division.

== Final League Table ==
Pos	Team	Pld	W	D	L	GF	GA	GAv	Pts
14	Chelsea	42	18	4	20	77	98	0.786	40
15	Leeds United	42	15	9	18	57	74	0.770	39
16	Everton	42	17	4	21	71	87	0.816	38
17	Luton Town	42	12	13	17	68	71	0.958	37
18	Tottenham Hotspur	42	13	10	19	85	95	0.895	36

Source: World Football
Rules for classification: 1) Points; 2) Goal average; 3) Goals scored

== Results ==
Win	Draw	Loss

=== Football League First Division ===
Date	Opponent	Venue	Result	Attendance	Scorers
23 August 1958	Leicester City	A	0–2	34,446	
27 August 1958	Preston North End	H	1–4	52,306	
30 August 1958	Newcastle United	H	0–2	36,602	
1 September 1958	Preston North End	A	1–3	28,339	
6 September 1958	Arsenal	H	1–6	40,557	
9 September 1958	Burnley	A	1–3	23,050	
13 September 1958	Manchester City	A	3–1	35,437	
17 September 1958	Burnley	H	1–2	50,457	
20 September 1958	Leeds United	H	3–2	31,105	
27 September 1958	West Bromwich Albion	A	3–2	35,791	
4 October 1958	Birmingham City	H	3–1	39,408	
11 October 1958	Tottenham Hotspur	A	4–10	37,794	
18 October 1958	Manchester United	H	3–2	64,079	
25 October 1958	Blackpool	A	1–1	19,426	
1 November 1958	Blackburn Rovers	H	2–2	52,733	
8 November 1958	Aston Villa	A	4–2	27,649	
15 November 1958	West Ham United	H	2–2	40,819	
22 November 1958	Nottingham Forest	A	1–2	26,440	
29 November 1958	Chelsea	H	3–1	30,638	
6 December 1958	Wolverhampton Wanderers	A	0–1	27,074	
13 December 1958	Portsmouth	H	2–1	23,875	
20 December 1958	Leicester City	H	0–1	27,703	
26 December 1958	Bolton Wanderers	H	1–0	61,692	
27 December 1958	Bolton Wanderers	A	3–0	37,263	
3 January 1959	Newcastle United	A	0–4	42,475	
17 January 1959	Arsenal	A	1–3	39,272	
31 January 1959	Manchester City	H	3–1	43,409	
7 February 1959	Leeds United	A	0–1	18,200	
18 February 1959	West Bromwich Albion	H	3–3	32,629	
21 February 1959	Birmingham City	A	1–2	22,660	
28 February 1959	Tottenham Hotspur	H	2–1	36,782	
7 March 1959	Manchester United	A	1–2	51,254	
14 March 1959	Blackpool	H	3–1	34,562	
21 March 1959	Blackburn Rovers	A	1–2	26,914	
27 March 1959	Luton Town	A	1–0	22,954	
28 March 1959	Aston Villa	H	2–1	34,986	
30 March 1959	Luton Town	H	3–1	32,620	
4 April 1959	West Ham United	A	2–3	28,266	
11 April 1959	Nottingham Forest	A	1–3	26,208	
15 April 1959	Portsmouth	A	3–2	12,714	
18 April 1959	Chelsea	A	1–3	24,366	
25 April 1959	Wolverhampton Wanderers	H	0–1	29,414	

=== FA Cup ===
Round	Date	Opponent	Venue	Result	Attendance	Goalscorers
3	10 January 1959	Sunderland	H	4–0	57,788	
4	24 January 1959	Charlton Athletic	A	2–2	44,094	
4:R	28 January 1959	Charlton Athletic	H	4–1	74,782	
5	14 February 1959	Aston Villa	H	1–4	60,225	
