= George Yardley (footballer) =

Scottish footballer (1942–2018)

Personal information
- Full name: George McArthur Yardley
- Date of birth: 8 October 1941
- Place of birth: Kirkcaldy, Fife, Scotland
- Date of death: 14 November 2018 (aged 76)
- Place of death: Dalgety Bay, Fife, Scotland
- Height: 5 ft 10 in (1.78 m)
- Positions: Goalkeeper; centre forward

Youth career
- Abbotshall Boy's Brigade
- Novar Star Youth
- Frances Colliery Juniors

Senior career*
Years	Team	Apps	(Gls)
1959–1964	East Fife	62	(17)
1964	Forfar Athletic	4	(0)
1965	St. George-Budapest		
1966	Luton Town	1	(0)
1966–1969	Tranmere Rovers	76	(49)
1969	St. George-Budapest		
1969–1970	Tranmere Rovers	46	(19)
- St. George-Budapest
1973–1974	Altrincham		
- * Club domestic league appearances and goals

George McArthur Yardley (8 October 1942 – 14 November 2018) was a Scottish footballer. Yardley began his career as a goalkeeper before becoming a centre forward, most notably for Tranmere Rovers.

== Playing career ==
Born in Kirkcaldy, Fife, Yardley played his first football as a goalkeeper as an eight-year-old playing for Dunnikier Primary School. However, on moving to Temple Hall Secondary School he was forced to play as a forward because another goalkeeper was already playing. At Frances Colliery Juniors he played mostly as a forward, occasionally playing in goal.

In 1959 he signed an amateur contract with East Fife as a goalkeeper. After sustaining a hand injury in 1960 Yardley switched to primarily playing as a forward though he did play a number of matches in goal. In 1964 Yardley trialled with Forfar Athletic, playing four matches. He then played out the second half of the 1963/1964 season with Montrose.

Yardley played for Australian club St. George-Budapest in three separate stints. He played one season at St. George during the 1965 Australian season after emigrating to Australia in August 1964.

On returning from Australia in October 1966, Yardley trialled for a month with English Fourth Division team Luton Town, playing one match. In November 1966 he moved to Tranmere Rovers. In four seasons between 1966 and 1970 he played 123 matches, scoring 68 goals. He was leading goal scorer for Rovers on four separate occasions.

His second stint in Australia was in 1969 before returning to Tranmere Rovers. At the completion of his career at Tranmere he moved again to Australia. Yardley had a short stint with Altrincham in the 1973–74 season.

=== International career ===
Yardley played one match on 5 March 1960 for Scotland Amateurs against Wales at Rugby Park in Kilmarnock, which ended 3-3.

== Personal life ==
After his football career, Yardley became a design draughtsman on the Wirral. He died on 14 November 2018 in a care home at Dalgety Bay, Fife.
