= 1957–58 Everton F.C. season =

English football club season

Everton
1957–58 season
- Manager: Ian Buchan
- Ground: Goodison Park
- First Division: 16th
- FA Cup: Fourth Round
- Top goalscorer: League: Eddie Thomas (15); All: Eddie Thomas, Jimmy Harris (15)
Home colours	Away colours	Third colours

During the 1957–58 English football season, Everton F.C. competed in the Football League First Division.

== Final League Table ==
Pos	Team	Pld	W	D	L	GF	GA	GAv	Pts
14	Aston Villa	42	16	7	19	73	86	0.849	39
15	Bolton Wanderers	42	14	10	18	65	87	0.747	38
16	Everton	42	13	11	18	65	75	0.867	37
17	Leeds United	42	14	9	19	51	63	0.810	37
18	Leicester City	42	14	5	23	91	112	0.813	33

Source: World Football
Rules for classification: 1) Points; 2) Goal average; 3) Goals scored

== Results ==
Win	Draw	Loss

=== Football League First Division ===
Date	Opponent	Venue	Result	Attendance	Scorers
24 August 1957	Wolverhampton Wanderers	H	1–0	58,229	
28 August 1957	Manchester United	A	0–3	59,343	
31 August 1957	Aston Villa	A	1–0	37,759	
4 September 1957	Manchester United	H	3–3	71,868	
7 September 1957	Chelsea	H	3–0	45,066	
10 September 1957	Arsenal	A	3–2	42,013	
14 September 1957	Sunderland	H	3–1	47,119	
21 September 1957	Luton Town	A	1–0	19,797	
5 October 1957	Leicester City	A	2–2	28,922	
12 October 1957	Newcastle United	A	3–2	30,472	
16 October 1957	Arsenal	H	2–2	54,345	
19 October 1957	Burnley	H	1–1	45,024	
26 October 1957	Preston North End	A	1–3	31,449	
2 November 1957	West Bromwich Albion	H	1–1	53,879	
9 November 1957	Tottenham Hotspur	A	1–3	39,999	
16 November 1957	Birmingham City	H	0–2	34,875	
20 November 1957	Blackpool	H	0–0	47,765	
23 November 1957	Portsmouth	A	2–3	27,015	
30 November 1957	Sheffield Wednesday	H	1–1	31,011	
7 December 1957	Manchester City	A	2–6	20,912	
14 December 1957	Nottingham Forest	H	1–1	29,099	
21 December 1957	Wolverhampton Wanderers	A	0–2	29,447	
25 December 1957	Bolton Wanderers	H	1–1	29,584	
26 December 1957	Bolton Wanderers	A	5–1	23,462	
28 December 1957	Aston Villa	H	1–2	41,195	
11 January 1958	Chelsea	A	1–3	29,490	
18 January 1958	Sunderland	A	1–1	26,507	
1 February 1958	Luton Town	H	0–2	26,908	
15 February 1958	Leicester City	H	2–2	23,460	
22 February 1958	Newcastle United	H	1–2	22,448	
1 March 1958	Burnley	A	2–0	19,657	
8 March 1958	Preston North End	H	4–2	43,291	
15 March 1958	West Bromwich Albion	A	0–4	31,915	
22 March 1958	Portsmouth	H	4–2	23,179	
29 March 1958	Birmingham City	A	1–2	21,628	
4 April 1958	Leeds United	H	0–1	32,679	
5 April 1958	Tottenham Hotspur	H	3–4	30,149	
7 April 1958	Leeds United	A	0–1	25,188	
12 April 1958	Sheffield Wednesday	A	1–2	17,514	
19 April 1958	Manchester City	H	2–5	31,433	
23 April 1958	Blackpool	A	1–0	12,981	
26 April 1958	Nottingham Forest	A	3–0	16,879	

=== FA Cup ===
Round	Date	Opponent	Venue	Result	Attendance	Goalscorers
3	4 January 1958	Sunderland	A	2–2	34,602	
3:R	8 January 1958	Sunderland	H	3–1	56,952	
4	29 January 1958	Blackburn Rovers	H	1–2	75,818	
