= John Willie Parker =

English footballer

Personal information
- Full name: John William Parker
- Date of birth: 5 July 1925
- Place of birth: Birkenhead, England
- Date of death: August 1988 (aged 63)
- Position: Inside forward

Senior career*
Years	Team	Apps	(Gls)
1947–1956	Everton	167	(82)
1956–1959	Bury	82	(43)
- * Club domestic league appearances and goals

John Willie Parker (5 July 1925 – August 1988) was an English professional footballer.

== Career ==
Parker started his career across the River Mersey from his Birkenhead birthplace as an amateur for Everton in 1947, though he did not make his debut until 1951. He was the club's leading scorer for four seasons in a row, from 1951–52 to 1954–55, scoring 31 times in 1953–54 as Everton was promoted from Football League Division Two to Division One, one half of a prolific partnership with Dave Hickson. He left for Bury in 1956, playing for the club until 1959, having made 82 appearances and scoring 43 goals.
