= Dave Russell (footballer) =

Scottish footballer and manager

Personal information
- Date of birth: 7 April 1914
- Place of birth: Dundee, Scotland
- Date of death: 12 June 2000 (aged 86)
- Place of death: Birkenhead, England
- Position: Right half

Senior career*
Years	Team	Apps	(Gls)
- Dundee
–1938	East Fife	92	
1938–1939	Sheffield Wednesday		

Managerial career
- 1953–1961: Bury
- 1961–1969: Tranmere Rovers
- * Club domestic league appearances and goals

Dave Russell (7 April 1914 – 12 June 2000) was a Scottish football player and manager. He won the Scottish Cup with East Fife in 1938, and was manager of both Bury and Tranmere Rovers for eight years.

== Playing career ==
Russell played for his hometown club Dundee before joining East Fife. Winning the Scottish Cup in 1938, Russell played 92 games for The Fifers before joining Sheffield Wednesday for the next season, where he was an ever-present as the club finished third in Division Two. As it did with so many players, World War II hampered Russell's career.

== Managerial career ==
After a stint in the Royal Air Force, Russell became a coach for the Danish Football Association before returning to England in 1950 to take up a coaching role at Bury. In 1953, Russell became the manager and led the Shakers for eight years. The club played 379 games under him between 1953 and 1961, winning 154, losing 139 and drawing 86 match. However, whilst at Bury, finances were a severe problem for Russell, and in 1957 they suffered relegation from Division Two for the first time in 63 years. Fortunes soon turned around though for the Scotsman, and he guided Bury back to Division Two in the 1960–61 season.

He then took over as manager of Tranmere Rovers, at the time two divisions lower than Bury, replacing Walter Galbraith who had been in charge for less than a year. After near misses and disappointments along the way, he finally steered Rovers back to the Third Division at the conclusion of 1966–67 season. In 1969, Russell became the club's general manager to allow his long-time coach, Jackie Wright, to take over the managerial reins, having guided the team to 167 wins and 130 defeats over a 379-game and eight-year stint as manager. In 1978 Russell left the club for the final time. Since then, one of the hospitality suites at Tranmere's ground Prenton Park has been named after Russell.
