= Ian Buchan =

Scottish football manager

Ian Buchan (c.1920–1965) was manager of Everton Football Club from 1956 to 1958. There had been a brief period after the departure of the previous manager, Cliff Britton when Everton was run by a committee. The reason for Buchan's appointment was a mystery. He was only given the title 'chief coach' so there must have been reservations already and he never gained the confidence of the board. He had been a Scottish amateur international and was likeable but was out of his depth as a manager of a major team with an ambitious chairman (John Moores). There were two poor seasons and Buchan was sacked after six straight defeats. He was replaced by Johnny Carey. He returned to Scotland and was killed in a car crash in 1965 at the age of 45.
