= 1936–37 Everton F.C. season =

English football club season

Everton
1936–37 season
- Manager: Run by committee
- Ground: Goodison Park
- First Division: 17th
- FA Cup: Fifth Round
- Top goalscorer: League: Dixie Dean (24); All: Dixie Dean (27)
- Highest home attendance: 59,440 (vs. Arsenal, 26 December 1936)
- Lowest home attendance: 11,105 (vs. Charlton Athletic, 17 April 1937)
- Biggest win: 7–0 (vs. Derby, 25 December 1936, First Division)
- Biggest defeat: 7–2 (at Wolves, 13 February 1937, First Division)
colours	colours

During the 1936–37 English football season, Everton competed in the Football League First Division.

== Final league table ==
Pos	Team	Pld	W	D	L	GF	GA	GAv	Pts
15	Huddersfield Town	42	12	15	15	62	64	0.969	39
16	West Bromwich Albion	42	16	6	20	77	98	0.786	38
17	Everton	42	14	9	19	81	78	1.038	37
18	Liverpool	42	12	11	19	62	84	0.738	35
19	Leeds United	42	15	4	23	60	80	0.750	34

Source: World Football
Rules for classification: 1) Points; 2) Goal average; 3) Goals scored

== Results ==
Win	Draw	Loss

=== Football League First Division ===
29 August 1936 1	Arsenal	3–2	Everton	London
	James 34'; Hapgood 57'; Bowden 80'		Dean 36'; Stevenson 75'	Stadium: Highbury; Attendance: 50,321; Referee: William Harper

2 September 1936 2	Everton	3–1	Sheffield Wednesday	Liverpool
	Dean 29'; Stevenson 42'; Gillick 72'		Luke 37'	Stadium: Goodison Park; Attendance: 31,586; Referee: J. Mellor

5 September 1936 3	Everton	3–0	Brentford	Liverpool
	Dean 19', 24'; Gillick 38'			Stadium: Goodison Park; Attendance: 37,524; Referee: G. Denton

10 September 1936 4	Sheffield Wednesday	6–4	Everton	Sheffield
	Dewar 6', 45' (??); Rimmer 21' (??); Luke 47'		Miller 19'; Gillick 50', 52'; Stevenson 85'	Stadium: Hillsborough; Attendance: 15,444; Referee: J. Mellor

10 September 1936 5	Bolton Wanderers	1–2	Everton	Bolton
	Westwood 78'		Stevenson 14'; Gillick 85'	Stadium: Burnden Park; Attendance: 18,029; Referee: H. Dedman

19 September 1936 6	Everton	2–0	Liverpool	Liverpool
	Stevenson 64'; Dean 73'			Stadium: Goodison Park; Attendance: 55,835; Referee: G. Gould

26 September 1936 7	Everton	2–1	Huddersfield Town	Liverpool
	Hurel 52'; Dean 59'		Chester 76'	Stadium: Goodison Park; Attendance: 33,581; Referee: W. Bristow

3 October 1936 8	Sunderland	3–1	Everton	Sunderland
	Gallacher 24'; Carter 30'; Gurney 48'		Stevenson 67'	Stadium: Roker Park; Attendance: 36,697; Referee: W. Jennings

10 October 1936 9	Everton	1–0	Wolves	Liverpool
	Dean 30'			Stadium: Goodison Park; Attendance: 33,153; Referee: C. Fletcher

17 October 1936 10	Leeds United	3–0	Everton	Leeds
	Thomson 5'; Stephenson 9'; Hydes 51'			Stadium: Elland Road; Attendance: 16,861; Referee: B. Ames

17 October 1936 11	Everton	3–3	Birmingham City	Liverpool
	Gillick 22'; Dean 65'; Stevenson 67'		Brunskill 31'; Harris 40'; Morris 55'	Stadium: Goodison Park; Attendance: 26,944; Referee: T. Thompson

17 October 1936 12	Middlesbrough	2–0	Everton	Middlesbrough
	Fenton 13'; Birkett 77'			Stadium: Ayresome Park; Attendance: 23,569; Referee: H. Taylor

7 November 1936 13	Everton	4–2	West Brom	Liverpool
	Dean 11', 28', 65'; Cunliffe 47'		Richardson 26'; Wood 72'	Stadium: Goodison Park; Attendance: 20,901; Referee: R. Mortimer

14 November 1936 14	Manchester City	4–1	Everton	Manchester
	Toseland 7'; Rodger 43', 75'; Brook 80' (pen.)		Stevenson 63'	Stadium: Maine Road; Attendance: 27,818; Referee: C. Argent

21 November 1936 15	Everton	4–0	Portsmouth	Liverpool
	Gillick 42'; Stevenson 51'; Coulter 54', 87'			Stadium: Goodison Park; Attendance: 29,940; Referee: G. Gould

28 November 1936 16	Chelsea	4–0	Everton	London
	Weaver 15'; George Mills 28', 46', 74'			Stadium: Stamford Bridge; Attendance: 31,623; Referee: T. Smith

5 December 1936 17	Everton	1–1	Stoke City	Liverpool
	Dean 88' (pen.)		Robson 1'	Stadium: Goodison Park; Attendance: 19,012; Referee: H. Wright

5 December 1936 18	Charlton Athletic	2–0	Everton	London
	Hobbis 56'; Boulter 87'			Stadium: The Valley; Attendance: 25,991; Referee: G. Jones

19 December 1936 19	Everton	3–0	Grimsby Town	Liverpool
	Dean 43', 90'; Gillick 59'			Stadium: Goodison Park; Attendance: 21,616; Referee: R. Blake

25 December 1936 20	Everton	7–0	Derby County	Liverpool
	Cunliffe (??); Dean (??); Stevenson (??)			Stadium: Goodison Park; Attendance: 32,349; Referee: E. Gamson

26 December 1936 21	Everton	1–1	Arsenal	Liverpool
	Gillick 31'		Kirchen 44'	Stadium: Goodison Park; Attendance: 59,440; Referee: W. Harper

28 December 1936 22	Derby County	3–1	Everton	Derby
	Astley 1', 40', 62'		Dean 61' (pen.)	Stadium: The Baseball Ground; Attendance: 22,608; Referee: E. Gamson

1 January 1937 23	Everton	2–2	Preston North End	Liverpool
	Leyfield 2'; Gillick 88'		O'Donnell 41', 57'	Stadium: Goodison Park; Attendance: 28,824; Referee: J. Rennie

2 January 1937 24	Brentford	2–2	Everton	London
	Hopkins 65'; McKenzie 73' (pen.)		Coulter 32'; Cunliffe 75'	Stadium: Griffin Park; Attendance: 20,457; Referee: G. Denton

9 January 1937 25	Everton	3–2	Bolton Wanderers	Liverpool
	Stevenson 16'; Dean 68', 81'		Taylor 57'; Halford 89'	Stadium: Goodison Park; Attendance: 24,422; Referee: H. Dedman

9 January 1937 26	Liverpool	3–2	Everton	Liverpool
	Howe 8'; Taylor 12'; Balmer 59'		Stevenson 18', 79'	Stadium: Anfield; Attendance: 37,055; Referee: G. Gould

3 February 1937 27	Huddersfield Town	0–3	Everton	Huddersfield
			Coulter 66'; Cunliffe (??); Bell (??)	Stadium: Leeds Road; Attendance: 5,216; Referee: W. Bristow

6 February 1937 28	Everton	3–0	Sunderland	Liverpool
	Dean 16', 77'; Coulter 21'			Stadium: Goodison Park; Attendance: 41,147; Referee: W. Jennings

13 February 1937 29	Wolves	7–2	Everton	Wolverhampton
	Clayton 16', 18', 43', 73'; Galley 39', 70'; Ashall 53'		Cunliffe 19'; Lawton 58' (pen.)	Stadium: Molineux; Attendance: 36,551; Referee: C. Fletcher

27 February 1937 30	Birmingham City	2–0	Everton	Birmingham
	Beattie 10'; White 67'			Stadium: St. Andrew's; Attendance: 21,150; Referee: T. Thompson

27 February 1937 31	Everton	7–1	Leeds United	Liverpool
	Dean 15', 85'; Lawton 30'; Geldard 56'; Stevenson 70', 88'; Gillick 75'		Hodgson 86'	Stadium: Goodison Park; Attendance: 17,064; Referee: B. Ames

6 March 1937 32	Everton	2–3	Middlesbrough	Liverpool
	Stevenson 60'; Geldard 65'		Fenton 34'; Camsell 68', 77'	Stadium: Goodison Park; Attendance: 30,719; Referee: H. Taylor

13 March 1937 33	West Brom	2–1	Everton	West Bromwich
	Shaw 20' (pen.); Richardson 26'		Gillick 15'	Stadium: The Hawthorns; Attendance: 26,284; Referee: R. Mortimer

20 March 1937 34	Everton	1–1	Manchester City	Liverpool
	Stevenson 60'		Percival 75'	Stadium: Goodison Park; Attendance: 31,921; Referee: C. Argent

26 March 1937 35	Manchester United	2–1	Everton	Manchester
	Baird 30'; Mutch 71'		Gillick 82'	Stadium: Old Trafford; Attendance: 30,071; Referee: E. Smith

27 March 1937 36	Portsmouth	2–2	Everton	Portsmouth
	Anderson 20'; Weddle 44'		Gillick 3'; Geldard 90'	Stadium: Fratton Park; Attendance: 24,411; Referee: G. Gould

29 March 1937 37	Everton	2–3	Manchester United	Liverpool
	Lawton 28'; Stevenson 68'		Mutch 27'; Bryant 49' (pen.); Ferrier 66'	Stadium: Goodison Park; Attendance: 28,395; Referee: E. Smith

3 April 1937 38	Everton	0–0	Chelsea	Liverpool
				Stadium: Goodison Park; Attendance: 20,648; Referee: T. Smith

10 April 1937 39	Stoke City	2–1	Everton	Stoke-on-Trent
	Mercer 65' (o.g.); Westland 71'		Cunliffe 19'	Stadium: The Victoria Ground; Attendance: 17,749; Referee: L. Dale

14 April 1937 40	Preston North End	1–0	Everton	Preston
	O'Donnell 31'			Stadium: Deepdale; Attendance: 8,675; Referee: J. Rennie

17 April 1937 41	Everton	2–2	Charlton Athletic	Liverpool
	Dean 29' (pen.); Cunliffe 55'		Tadman 40', 80'	Stadium: Goodison Park; Attendance: 11,105; Referee: G. Jones

24 April 1937 42	Grimsby Town	1–0	Everton	Cleethorpes
	Glover 20'			Stadium: Blundell Park; Attendance: 9,773; Referee: W. Ross-Gower

=== FA Cup ===
16 January 1937 3	Everton	5–0	Bournemouth	Liverpool
	Gillick 2', 46'; Cunliffe 67'Stevenson 72', 78'			Stadium: Goodison Park; Attendance: 35,468; Referee: E. Brown

30 January 1937 4	Everton	3–0	Sheffield Wednesday	Liverpool
	Britton 37' (pen.); Dean 40'; Coulter 69'			Stadium: Goodison Park; Attendance: 35,807; Referee: G. Jones

20 February 1937 5	Everton	1–1	Tottenham Hotspur	Liverpool
	Coulter 89'		McCormick 81'	Stadium: Goodison Park; Attendance: 57,149; Referee: Dr. A. Barton

22 February 1937 5R	Tottenham Hotspur	4–3	Everton	London
	Morrison 27', 68', 90'; Meek 87'		Lawton 2'; Dean 20', 66'	Stadium: White Hart Lane; Attendance: 46,972; Referee: H. Mee

== Squad ==
Note: Flags indicate national team as defined under FIFA eligibility rules; some limited exceptions apply. Players may hold more than one non-FIFA nationality.

Pos.	Nation	Player
GK	ENG	Frank King
GK	ENG	Harry Morton
GK	ENG	Ted Sagar
DF	NIR	Billy Cook
DF	ENG	Charlie Gee
DF	ENG	George Jackson
DF	ENG	Jack Jones
DF	WAL	T. G. Jones
DF	ENG	Joe Mercer
DF	ENG	Tommy White
MF	ENG	Stan Bentham
MF	ENG	Cliff Britton
MF	ENG	Jackie Coulter

Pos.	Nation	Player
MF	SCO	Jock Thomson
MF	ENG	Gordon Watson
FW	ENG	Bunny Bell
FW	ENG	Jimmy Cunliffe
FW	ENG	Dixie Dean
FW	ENG	Albert Geldard
FW	SCO	Torry Gillick
FW	Jersey	Elie Hurel
FW	ENG	Tommy Lawton
FW	ENG	Charlie Leyfield
FW	SCO	Willie Miller
FW	IRL	Alex Stevenson
