= List of Everton F.C. international players =

Everton Football Club, an association football club based in Liverpool, Merseyside, was founded in 1878 and competes in the top flight of English football the Premier League. Everton have a storied history winning nine League titles, five FA Cups and the European Cup Winners' Cup.

Players of the club can be called up to represent their national team and to date 252 players have played at senior international level whilst registered with the club. Everton's first international was Job Wilding who appeared for Wales against England on 14 March 1885. The most recent newly capped player is Odin Samules-Smith for Jamaica against India on 27 May 2026.

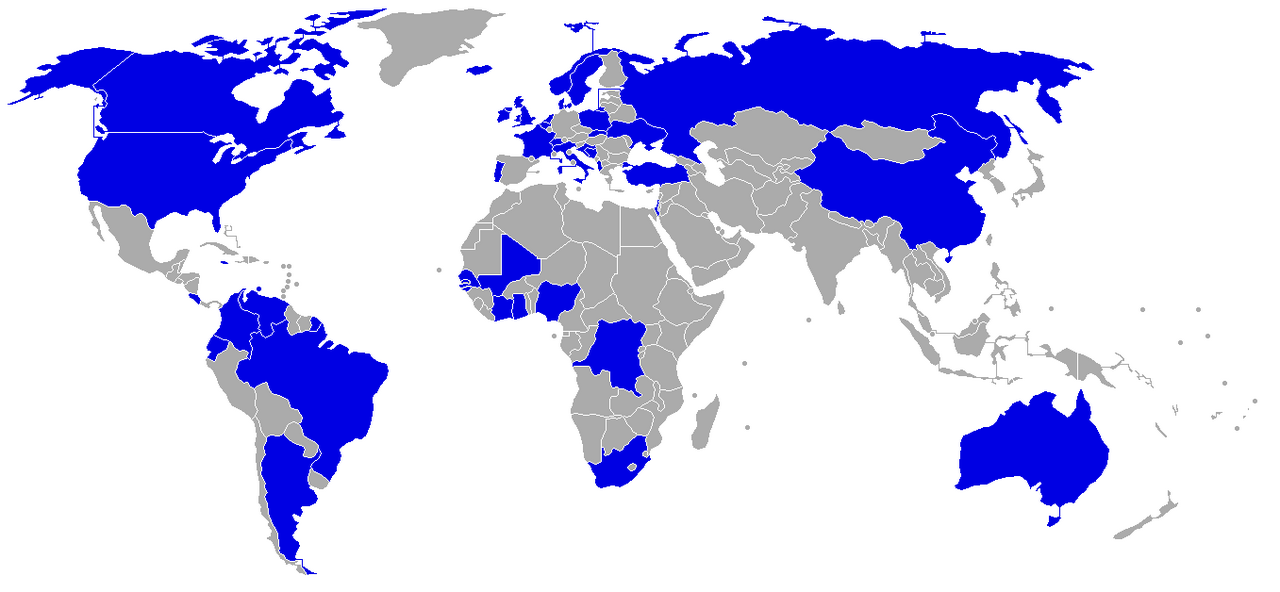
Countries (in blue) in which Everton players have been capped at international level.

Robert Warzycha became the first player from outside of the British Isles to represent his country, Poland in 1991 (Although some players born outside of the British Isles had played internationally for the club for Home Nation sides such as Pat Van Den Hauwe born in Belgium but representing Wales). Daniel Amokachi was the first non-European representative for Nigeria in 1993.

Since 2016, Tim Howard holds the record for most caps won with 93 for the United States of America. Previously Neville Southall had held the record with 91 caps for Wales since the early 1980s.

Dixie Dean held the record for most international goals with 18 for England held from the 1930s. Tim Cahill matched this in 2012 for Australia.

37 individual Everton players have represented their countries at the World Cup, with Everton being represented in 13 of the 22 tournaments (currently having taken part in 10 consecutive tournaments since 1986. Alex Parker the first in 1958 for Scotland. At the most recent World Cup in 2022, 4 Everton players represented three countries. Tim Cahill, Jordan Pickford and Idrissa Gueye, representing Australia, England and Senegal respectively, are the only players to appear at more than one World Cup whilst being contracted to Everton.

Over 2800 caps for 46 countries have been earned by players while contracted to Everton.

The most Everton players to play in a single fixture was between the Republic of Ireland and England on 7 June 2015 when five players (three for Ireland, two for England) appeared.

== List of internationals ==
The following list includes only caps earned while contracted to Everton.

Three Everton players (Eglington, Farrell and Stevenson) were dual internationals for Ireland. Their caps are listed separately below but included only once in the total player count of 251.

The following list includes only caps earned while playing for Everton. This includes players on loan to Everton but not players out on loan to other sides. For example: Neville Southall earned 92 Wales caps while contracted to Everton, one of these was while on loan to Port Vale and thus is not included.

Updated as of fixtures played 1 July 2026

Name	Country	Caps	Goals	Years
Walter Abbott	England	1	-	1902
Niclas Alexandersson	Sweden	23	2	2000–2003
Allan	Brazil	1	-	2020
Daniel Amokachi	Nigeria	6	2	1994–1995
Victor Anichebe	Nigeria	10	1	2008–2011
Smart Arridge	Wales	3	-	1894–1896
Christian Atsu	Ghana	13	3	2014–2015
Yakubu Ayegbeni	Nigeria	24	7	2008–2010
Leighton Baines	England	30	1	2010–2015
Ibrahima Bakayoko	Ivory Coast	4	1	1999
Alan Ball	England	39	6	1966–1971
Michael Ball	England	1	-	2001
William Balmer	England	1	-	1905
Ross Barkley	England	22	2	2013–2016
Nick Barmby	England	5	-	2000
Jack Bell	Scotland	3	1	1896–1898
Muhamed Bešić	Bosnia and Herzegovina	21	-	2014–2020
Beto	Guinea-Bissau	10	1	2024-2025
Slaven Bilić	Croatia	14	2	1997–1999
Diniyar Bilyaletdinov	Russia	17	4	2009–2011
Billy Bingham	Northern Ireland	12	2	1960–1964
Jesper Blomqvist	Sweden	1	-	2002
Yannick Bolasie	DR Congo	8	1	2016–2020
Tom Booth	England	1	-	1903
Wally Boyes	England	2	-	1938
Paul Bracewell	England	3	-	1985
Jarrad Branthwaite	England	1	-	2024
Dod Brewster	Scotland	1	-	1921
Cliff Britton	England	9	1	1934–1938
Armando Broja	Albania	4	0	2025
Tim Cahill	Australia	53	18	2004–2012
Dominic Calvert-Lewin	England	11	4	2020–2021
Lee Carsley	Republic of Ireland	21	-	2002–2008
Segundo Castillo	Ecuador	7	-	2008–2009
Edgar Chadwick	England	7	3	1891–1897
Sam Chedgzoy	England	8	-	1920–1924
Dave Clements	Northern Ireland	12	-	1973–1975
Tommy Clinton	Republic of Ireland	3	-	1951–1954
Séamus Coleman	Republic of Ireland	80	1	2011–2026
Bobby Collins	Scotland	6	3	1958–1959
John Collins	Scotland	6	1	1998–1999
John Connolly	Scotland	1	-	1973
Billy Cook	Ireland	12	-	1935–1939
Peter Corr	Republic of Ireland	4	-	1949
Tony Cottee	England	4	-	1988–1989
Jackie Coulter	Ireland	5	1	1934–1937
Warney Cresswell	England	1	-	1929
Jimmy Cunliffe	England	1	-	1936
Dai Davies	Wales	16	-	1975–1977
Joe Davies	Wales	2	-	1889
Llewellyn Davies	Wales	2	-	1889
Simon Davies	Wales	12	1	2005–2006
Stan Davies	Wales	3	1	1921
William "Dixie" Dean	England	16	18	1927–1932
Lucas Digne	France	22	-	2018–2021
Martin Dobson	England	1	-	1974
Don Donovan	Republic of Ireland	5	-	1954–1957
Abdoulaye Doucouré	Mali	2	-	2022
Landon Donovan	United States	1	-	2010
Dicky Downs	England	1	-	1920
Shane Duffy	Republic of Ireland	1	-	2014
Jimmy Dunn	Scotland	1	1	1928
Richard Dunne	Republic of Ireland	6	2	2000
Tommy Eglington *	Ireland	6	-	1946–1948
Tommy Eglington *	Republic of Ireland	22	2	1946–1955
Peter Farrell *	Ireland	7	-	1946–1949
Peter Farrell *	Republic of Ireland	26	3	1946–1957
Gareth Farrelly	Republic of Ireland	2	-	1998
Marouane Fellaini	Belgium	33	6	2008–2013
Duncan Ferguson	Scotland	3	-	1994–1997
Bert Freeman	England	2	1	1909
Ramio Funes Mori	Argentina	18	1	2015–2017
Jimmy Gabriel	Scotland	2	-	1960–1963
James Garner	England	2	-	2026
Fred Geary	England	2	3	1890–1891
Cecil Gee	England	3	-	1931, 1936
Albert Geldard	England	4	-	1933–1937
Scott Gemmill	Scotland	13	1	1999–2003
Darron Gibson	Republic of Ireland	10	-	2012–2016
Torry Gillick	Scotland	5	3	1937–1938
Ben Godfrey	England	2	-	2021
Francis Gomez	Gambia	1	0	2025
Thomas Gravesen	Denmark	44	5	2000–2004
Andy Gray	Scotland	1	-	1985
Demari Gray	Jamaica	5	2	2023
Phil Griffiths	Wales	1	-	1931
Thomas Griffiths	Wales	8	1	1927–1931
Idrissa Gueye	Senegal	76	4	2016–2026
Brian Hamilton	Northern Ireland	11	-	1976–1977
Harold Hardman	England	4	1	1905–1908
Val Harris	Ireland	14	-	1909–1914
George Harrison	England	2	-	1921
Asa Hartford	Scotland	8	1	1979, 1981
Colin Harvey	England	1	-	1971
John Heitinga	Netherlands	40	1	2009–2013
Jimmy Hill	Northern Ireland	3	-	1963
Andy Hinchcliffe	England	4	-	1996–1997
Barry Horne	Wales	23	-	1992–1996
Johnny Holt	England	9	-	1890–1895
Marc Hottiger	Switzerland	7	-	1996
Johnny Houston	Ireland	3	-	1913–1914
Ben Howard Baker	England	1	-	1921
Tim Howard	United States	93	-	2007–2016
Bob Howarth	England	1	-	1894
Teddy Hughes	Wales	2	-	1899
Jack Humphreys	Wales	1	-	1947
Don Hutchison	Scotland	10	5	1999–2000
Bobby Irvine	Ireland	11	3	1922–1928
Alex Iwobi	Nigeria	27	4	2019–2023
Tommy Jackson	Northern Ireland	6	-	1968–1969
Lars Jacobsen	Denmark	6	-	2008–2009
Phil Jagielka	England	40	3	2008–2016
Frank Jefferis	England	2	-	1912
Nikica Jelavić	Croatia	13	3	2012–2013
Pat Jennings	Northern Ireland	1	-	1986
Andy Johnson	England	6	-	2006–2007
Tommy Johnson	England	3	2	1931–1932
T. G. Jones	Wales	17	-	1938–1949
Robert Jones	Wales	1	-	1894
Andrei Kanchelskis	Russia	16	3	1995–1996
Tony Kay	England	1	1	1963
Moise Kean	Italy	2	-	2020
Michael Keane	England	10	1	2017–2020
Joe Kendrick	Ireland	1	-	1927
Martin Keown	England	9	1	1992
Kevin Kilbane	Republic of Ireland	24	1	2003–2006
Joshua King	Norway	3	-	2021
Davy Klaassen	Netherlands	2	-	2017
Bill Lacey	Ireland	10	1	1909–1912
Brian Labone	England	26	-	1962–1970
Bob Latchford	England	12	5	1977–1979
Shayne Lavery	Northern Ireland	1	-	2018
Tommy Lawton	England	8	6	1938–1939
Joleon Lescott	England	7	-	2007–2009
Tie Li	China	6	-	2003–2006
Anders Limpar	Sweden	11	1	1994–1996
Tobias Linderoth	Sweden	23	-	2002–2004
Jesper Lindstrøm	Denmark	2	-	2025
Gary Lineker	England	11	9	1985–1986
Romelu Lukaku	Belgium	31	15	2013–2017
Harry Makepeace	England	4	-	1906–1912
Orel Mangala	Belgium	4	-	2024
Cuco Martina	Curaçao	4	-	2017–2018
Neil McBain	Scotland	2	-	1923
Stuart McCall	Scotland	11	1	1990–1991
James McCarthy	Republic of Ireland	25	-	2013–2016
Alex McCartney	Ireland	2	-	1905
Jim McDonagh	Republic of Ireland	4	-	1981
James McFadden	Scotland	33	12	2003–2007
Aiden McGeady	Republic of Ireland	21	2	2014–2017
Mick Meagan	Republic of Ireland	4	-	1961–1964
Joe Mercer	England	5	-	1938–1939
Yerry Mina	Colombia	25	1	2019–2023
Kevin Mirallas	Belgium	30	5	2012–2017
Joe-Max Moore	United States	22	4	2010
Ján Mucha	Slovakia	16	-	2010–2012
Thomas Myhre	Norway	20	-	1998–2001
Vitaliy Mykolenko	Ukraine	33	1	2022–2026
Steven Naismith	Scotland	26	4	2012–2015
Gary Naysmith	Scotland	32	1	2001–2007
Iliman Ndiaye	Senegal	24	3	2024-2026
Lucas Neil	Australia	3	-	2009
Phil Neville	England	7	-	2006–2007
Pat Nevin	Scotland	8	1	1989–1992
Keith Newton	England	8	-	1970
Oumar Niasse	Senegal	3	1	2016–2018
Alex Nyarko	Ghana	1	-	2000
Eamonn O'Keefe	Republic of Ireland	1	-	1981
Robin Olsen	Sweden	10	-	2020–2021
Amadou Onana	Belgium	10	-	2022–2024
Jake O'Brien	Republic of Ireland	15		2024-2026
Jimmy O'Neill	Republic of Ireland	17	-	1952–1959
Henry Onyekuru	Nigeria	1	-	2019
Leon Osman	England	2	-	2012–2013
John Oster	Wales	3	-	1997–1998
Bryan Oviedo	Costa Rica	14	-	2012–2016
Alex Parker	Scotland	1	-	1958
Nathan Patterson	Scotland	23	-	2022–2026
Charlie Parry	Wales	6	-	1891–1895
Mark Pembridge	Wales	16	1	1999–2003
Gerry Peyton	Republic of Ireland	4	-	1992
Terry Phelan	Republic of Ireland	3	-	1997
Fred Pickering	England	3	5	1964
Jordan Pickford	England	81	-	2017–2026
Steven Pienaar	South Africa	36	-	2007–2012
Aubrey Powell	Wales	2	-	1948–1949
Isaac Price	Northern Ireland	2	-	2023
Tomasz Radzinski	Canada	9	6	2001–2004
Kevin Ratcliffe	Wales	58	-	1980–1991
Peter Reid	England	13	-	1985–1988
Richarlison	Brazil	37	14	2018–2022
Bruce Rioch	Scotland	6	-	1977
Antonee Robinson	United States	2	-	2018–2019
Jacky Robertson	Scotland	1	-	1898
Jack Rodwell	England	2	-	2011
James Rodríguez	Colombia	4	1	2020
Salomón Rondón	Venezuela	10	6	2022
Wayne Rooney	England	17	9	2003–2004
Dick Roose	Wales	2	-	1905
Joe Royle	England	2	1	1971–1972
Ted Sagar	England	4	-	1935–1936
Louis Saha	France	1	-	2010
Odin Samuels-Smith	Jamaica	1	-	2026
Alex Scott	Scotland	5	-	1963–1966
Billy Scott	Ireland	16	-	1905–1912
Peter Scott	Northern Ireland	2	-	1975
Jimmy Settle	England	4	-	1935–1936
Graeme Sharp	Scotland	12	1	1985–1988
Jack Sharp	England	2	1	1903–1905
Kevin Sheedy	Republic of Ireland	42	7	1983–1992
James Sheridan	Ireland	5	2	1903–1904
Gylfi Sigurðsson	Iceland	28	10	2017–2020
David Smallman	Wales	4	-	1975
Neville Southall	Wales	91	-	1982–1997
Gary Speed	Wales	9	1	1996–1997
Maarten Stekelenburg	Netherlands	4	-	2016
Trevor Steven	England	25	3	1985–1989
Gary Stevens	England	26	-	1985–1988
Alex Stevenson *	Ireland	14	5	1934–1947
Alex Stevenson *	Republic of Ireland	6	-	1946–1948
John Stones	England	10	-	2014–2016
Idan Tal	Israel	11	3	2000–2003
Derek Temple	England	1	-	1965
Mickey Thomas	Wales	1	-	1981
Jock Thomson	Scotland	1	-	1932
Claus Thomsen	Denmark	4	-	1997
Cenk Tosun	Turkey	20	10	2018–2020
Mark Travers	Republic of Ireland	2	-	2026
Alex Troup	Scotland	1	-	1926
Nuno Valente	Portugal	15	-	2005–2006
David Unsworth	England	1	-	1995
Enner Valencia	Ecuador	9	5	2016–2017
Pat Van Den Hauwe	Wales	13	-	1985–1989
Roy Vernon	Wales	13	1	1960–1963
Nikola Vlašić	Croatia	1	-	2017
Mickey Walsh	Republic of Ireland	1	-	1978
Mike Walsh	Republic of Ireland	4	-	1982
Robert Warzycha	Poland	17	1	1991–1993
Dave Watson	England	6	-	1986–1988
David Weir	Scotland	43	1	1999–2006
Gordon West	England	3	-	1968–1969
Tommy White	England	1	-	1933
Norman Whiteside	Northern Ireland	2	1	1989
Job Wilding	Wales	2	1	1886
Ashley Williams	Wales	15	-	2016–2019
Ben Williams	Wales	6	-	1931–1935
George Wilson	Scotland	1	-	1907
Ian Wilson	Scotland	3	-	1987
Ray Wilson	England	33	-	1965–1968
Sam Wolstenholme	England	1	-	1904
George Wood	Scotland	3	-	1987
Tommy Wright	England	11	-	1968–1970
Abel Xavier	Portugal	7	1	1999–2001
Joseph Yobo	Nigeria	55	6	2008–2011
Alex Young	Scotland	2	2	1961–1966
Alex 'Sandy' Young	Scotland	2	-	1905–1907
Kurt Zouma	France	1	-	2018

Country	Players	Caps	Goals	First	Last
England	72	619	92	1890	2026
Republic of Ireland	27	355	18	1946	2026
Wales	28	332	7	1886	2019
Scotland	33	275	39	1896	2026
Nigeria	6	123	20	1994	2023
United States	4	118	4	1999	2019
Belgium	6	114	26	2008	2024
Senegal	3	105	8	2016	2026
Ireland	12	105	12	1903	1947
Sweden	5	68	3	1994	2021
Australia	2	56	18	2004	2012
Denmark	4	56	5	1997	2025
Northern Ireland	9	52	3	1960	2023
Netherlands	3	46	1	2009	2017
Brazil	2	37	14	2018	2022
South Africa	1	36	-	2007	2012
Ukraine	1	33	1	2022	2026
Russia	2	33	7	1995	2011
Colombia	2	29	2	2019	2023
Croatia	3	28	5	1997	2007
Iceland	1	28	10	2017	2020
France	3	24	-	2010	2021
Norway	1	23	-	1998	2021
Portugal	2	22	1	1999	2006
Bosnia and Herzegovina	1	21	-	2014	2020
Turkey	1	20	10	2018	2020
Argentina	1	18	1	2015	2017
Poland	1	17	1	1991	1993
Ecuador	2	16	5	2008	2017
Slovakia	1	16	-	2010	2012
Ghana	2	14	3	2000	2014
Costa Rica	1	14	-	2012	2016
Israel	1	11	3	2000	2002
Venezuela	1	10	7	2022	2022
Canada	1	9	6	2001	2004
Guinea-Bissau	1	9	1	2024	2025
DR Congo	1	8	1	2016	2020
Switzerland	1	7	-	1996	1996
China	1	6	-	2003	2006
Jamaica	2	6	2	2023	2026
Ivory Coast	1	4	1	1999	1999
Curaçao	1	4	-	2017	2018
Albania	1	4	-	2025	2025
Italy	1	2	-	2020	2020
Mali	1	2	-	2022	2022
Gambia	1	1	-	2025	2025
Total * (252 when including 3 Irish dual national players)	255	2923	336		

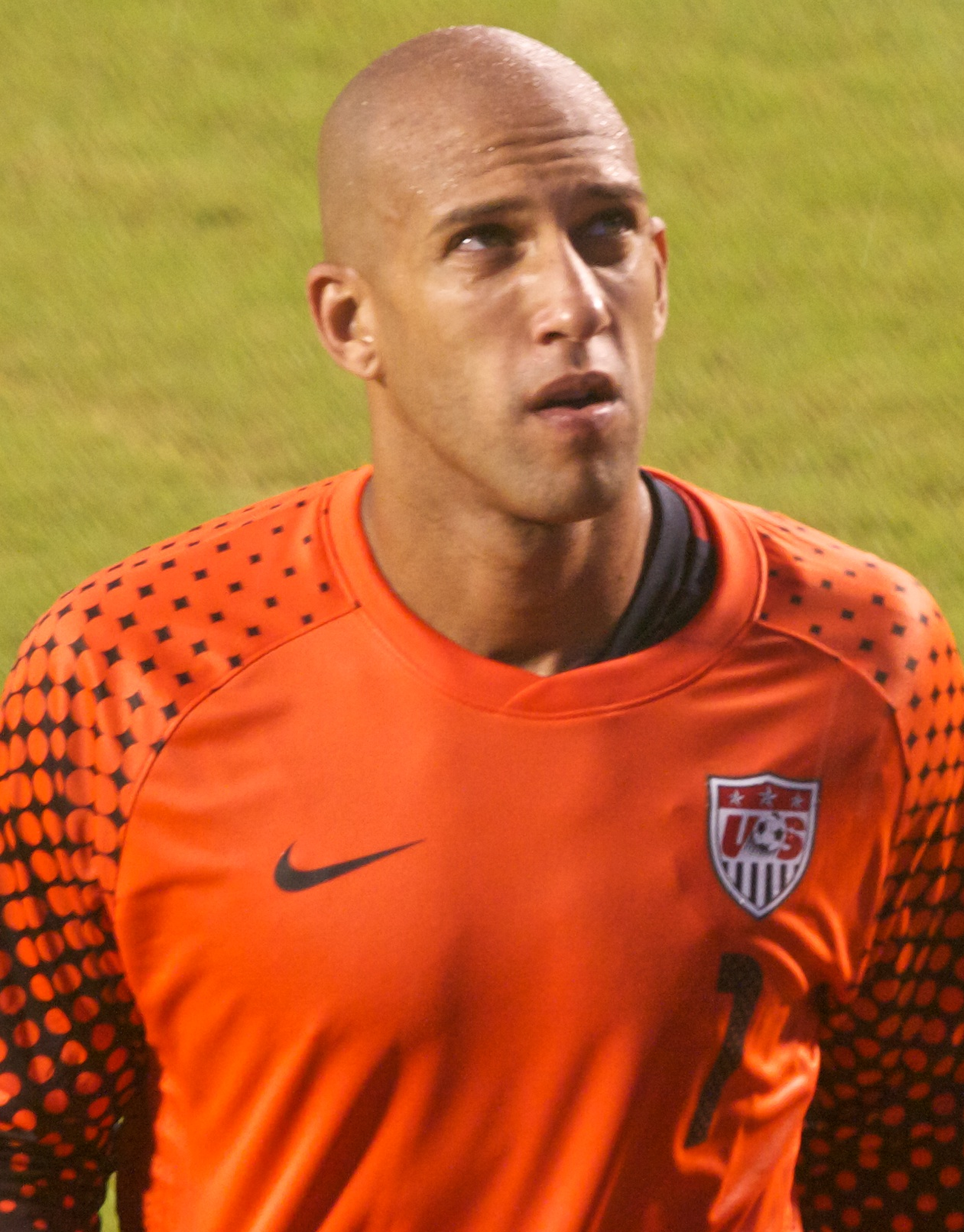
Tim Howard is Everton's most capped international, making 93 appearances for the United States.

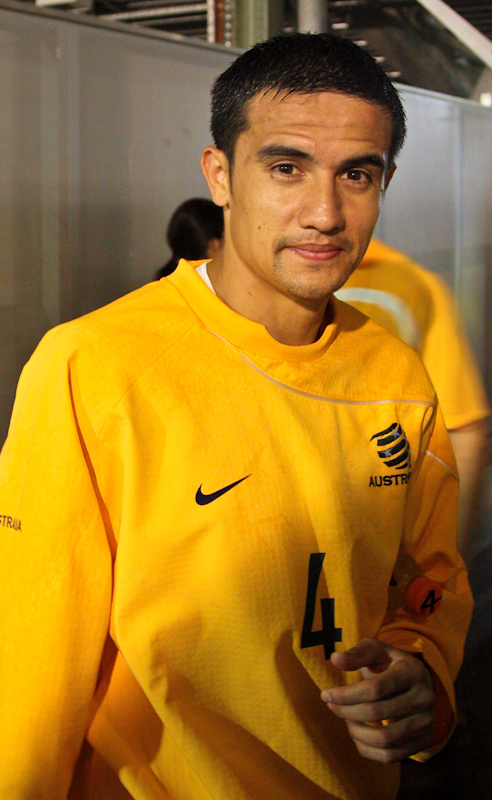
Australia's Tim Cahill holds the joint-record with Dixie Dean for most international goals scored while at Everton, with 18.

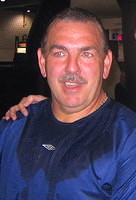
Neville Southall was Wales' most capped international until 2018. He made 92 appearances, 91 while playing for Everton in the 1980s and 1990s.

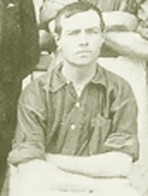
Fred Geary (along with Johnny Holt) was the first Everton player to represent England in 1890.

== FIFA World Cup players ==
The following were part of World Cup squads while playing for Everton.

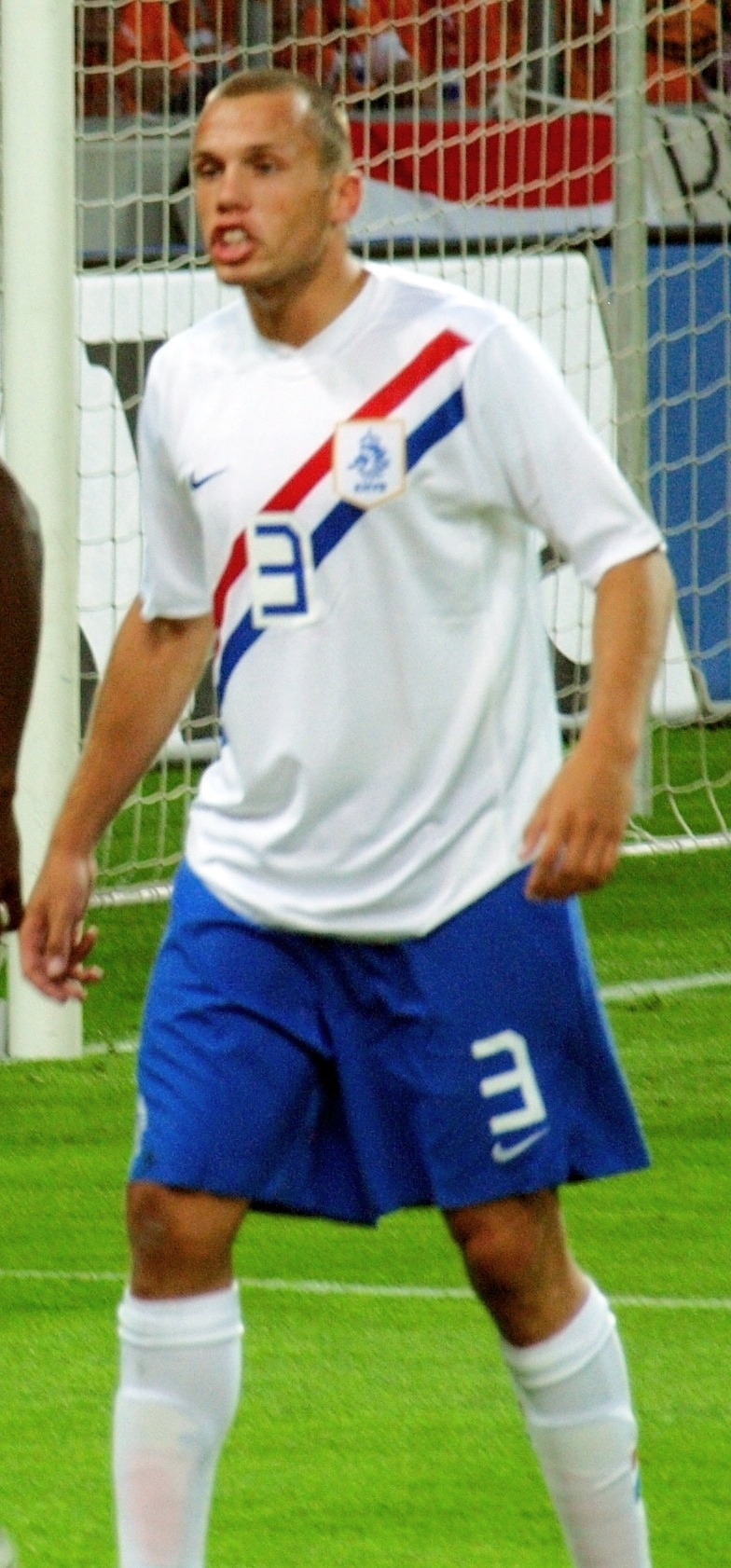
John Heitinga was runner-up for the Netherlands at the 2010 World Cup

Tournament	Players
1958 FIFA World Cup	(Scotland) Alex Parker, (Wales) Roy Vernon
1966 FIFA World Cup	(England) Ray Wilson
1970 FIFA World Cup	(England) Alan Ball, (England) Brian Labone, (England) Keith Newton, (England) Tommy Wright
1986 FIFA World Cup	(England) Gary Lineker, (England) Peter Reid, (Scotland) Graeme Sharp, (England) Trevor Steven, (England) Gary Stevens
1990 FIFA World Cup	(Scotland) Stuart McCall, (Republic of Ireland) Kevin Sheedy
1994 FIFA World Cup	(Sweden) Anders Limpar
1998 FIFA World Cup	(Croatia) Slaven Bilić
2002 FIFA World Cup	(Sweden) Niclas Alexandersson, (Republic of Ireland) Lee Carsley, (Denmark) Thomas Gravesen, (Sweden) Tobias Linderoth, (United States) Joe-Max Moore
2006 FIFA World Cup	(Australia) Tim Cahill, (Portugal) Nuno Valente
2010 FIFA World Cup	(Nigeria) Yakubu, (Australia) Tim Cahill, (Netherlands) John Heitinga, (South Africa) Steven Pienaar, (Nigeria) Joseph Yobo
2014 FIFA World Cup	(England) Leighton Baines, (England) Ross Barkley, (United States) Tim Howard, (England) Phil Jagielka, (Belgium) Kevin Mirallas
2018 FIFA World Cup	(Senegal) Idrissa Gueye, (England) Jordan Pickford, (Iceland) Gylfi Sigurðsson
2022 FIFA World Cup	(England) Conor Coady, (Senegal) Idrissa Gueye, (Belgium) Amadou Onana, (England) Jordan Pickford
2026 FIFA World Cup	(Senegal) Idrissa Gueye, (Senegal) Iliman Ndiaye, (Scotland) Nathan Patterson, (England) Jordan Pickford

== FIFA Confederations Cup players ==
The following were part of FIFA Confederations Cup squads while playing for Everton.

Tournament	Players
1995 King Fahd Cup	(Nigeria) Daniel Amokachi
2005 FIFA Confederations Cup	(Australia) Tim Cahill
2009 FIFA Confederations Cup	(United States) Tim Howard, (South Africa) Steven Pienaar

== AFC Asian Cup ==
The following were part of Asian Cup squads while playing for Everton.

Tournament	Players
2007 AFC Asian Cup	(Australia) Tim Cahill
2011 AFC Asian Cup	(Australia) Tim Cahill

== CAF Africa Cup of Nations ==
The following were part of Africa Cup of Nations squads while playing for Everton.

Tournament	Players
2004 African Cup of Nations	(Nigeria) Joseph Yobo
2006 Africa Cup of Nations	(Nigeria) Joseph Yobo
2008 Africa Cup of Nations	(Nigeria) Yakubu, (South Africa) Steven Pienaar, (Nigeria) Joseph Yobo
2010 Africa Cup of Nations	(Nigeria) Yakubu, (Nigeria) Joseph Yobo
2015 Africa Cup of Nations	(Ghana) Christian Atsu
2017 Africa Cup of Nations	(Senegal) Idrissa Gueye
2019 Africa Cup of Nations	(Senegal) Idrissa Gueye, (Nigeria) Henry Onyekuru
2021 Africa Cup of Nations	(Nigeria) Alex Iwobi
2023 Africa Cup of Nations	(Senegal) Idrissa Gueye
2025 Africa Cup of Nations	(Senegal) Idrissa Gueye, (Senegal) Iliman Ndiaye

== CONCACAF Gold Cup ==
The following were part of Gold Cup squads while playing for Everton.

Tournament	Players
2007 CONCACAF Gold Cup	(United States) Tim Howard
2011 CONCACAF Gold Cup	(United States) Tim Howard
2019 CONCACAF Gold Cup	(Curaçao) Cuco Martina
2023 CONCACAF Gold Cup	(Jamaica) Demarai Gray

== CONMEBOL Copa América ==
The following were part of Copa América squads while playing for Everton.

Tournament	Players
Copa América Centenario	(Argentina) Ramiro Funes Mori, (United States) Tim Howard, (Costa Rica) Bryan Oviedo
2019 Copa América	(Colombia) Yerry Mina, (Brazil) Richarlison
2021 Copa América	(Colombia) Yerry Mina, (Brazil) Richarlison

== UEFA European Championship ==
The following were part of European Championship squads while playing for Everton.

Tournament	Players
UEFA Euro 1968	(England) Alan Ball, (England) Brian Labone, (England) Gordon West, (England) Ray Wilson, (England) Tommy Wright
UEFA Euro 1988	(England) Peter Reid, (Republic of Ireland) Kevin Sheedy, (England) Trevor Steven, (England) Gary Stevens, (England) Dave Watson
UEFA Euro 1992	(England) Martin Keown, (Scotland) Pat Nevin
UEFA Euro 1996	(Switzerland) Marc Hottiger, (Russia) Andrei Kanchelskis
UEFA Euro 2000	(England) Nick Barmby, (Norway) Thomas Myhre, (Portugal) Abel Xavier
UEFA Euro 2004	(Denmark) Thomas Gravesen, (Sweden) Tobias Linderoth, (England) Wayne Rooney
UEFA Euro 2012	(England) Leighton Baines, (Republic of Ireland) Darron Gibson, (England) Phil Jagielka, (Croatia) Nikica Jelavić, (Netherlands) John Heitinga
UEFA Euro 2016	(England) Ross Barkley, (Republic of Ireland) Seamus Coleman, (Belgium) Romelu Lukaku, (Republic of Ireland) James McCarthy, (Republic of Ireland) Aiden McGeady, (England) John Stones
UEFA Euro 2020	(England) Dominic Calvert-Lewin, (France) Lucas Digne, (Sweden) Robin Olsen, (England) Jordan Pickford
UEFA Euro 2024	(Ukraine) Vitaliy Mykolenko, (Belgium) Amadou Onana, (England) Jordan Pickford
