= 1937–38 Everton F.C. season =

English football club season

Everton
1937–38 season
- Manager: Run by Committee
- Ground: Goodison Park
- First Division: 14th
- FA Cup: Fourth Round
- Top goalscorer: League: Tommy Lawton (28); All: Tommy Lawton (28)
- Highest home attendance: 53,856 (vs. Arsenal, 28 August 1937)
- Lowest home attendance: 17,018 (vs. Birmingham City, 11 December 1937)
- Biggest win: 5–2 (vs. Portsmouth, 30 April 1938, First Division)
- Biggest defeat: 4–1 (vs. Arsenal, 28 August 1937, First Division)
colours	colours

During the 1937–38 English football season, Everton competed in the Football League First Division.

== Final league table ==
Pos	Team	Pld	W	D	L	GF	GA	GAv	Pts
12	Blackpool	42	16	8	18	61	66	0.924	40
13	Derby County	42	15	10	17	66	87	0.759	40
14	Everton	42	16	7	19	79	75	1.053	39
15	Huddersfield Town	42	17	5	20	55	68	0.809	39
16	Leicester City	42	14	11	17	54	75	0.720	39

Source: World Football
Rules for classification: 1) Points; 2) Goal average; 3) Goals scored

== Results ==
Win	Draw	Loss

=== Football League First Division ===
Date	Opponent	Venue	Result	Attendance	Goalscorers
28 August 1937	Arsenal	H	1–4	53,856	Dean
1 September 1937	Manchester City	A	0–2	27,603	
4 September 1937	Blackpool	A	0–1	27,423	
8 September 1937	Manchester City	H	4–1	27,290	Dougall, Lawton, Stevenson (2)
11 September 1937	Brentford	H	3–0	36,038	Cunliffe, Dougall, Stevenson
15 September 1937	Derby County	A	1–2	14,263	Lawton
18 September 1937	Bolton Wanderers	A	2–1	35,691	Lawton, Stevenson
25 September 1937	Huddersfield Town	H	1–2	35,272	Trentham
2 October 1937	Liverpool	A	2–1	43,904	Lawton (pen), Trentham
9 October 1937	Wolverhampton Wanderers	A	0–2	30,863	
16 October 1937	Leeds United	H	1–1	26,035	Lawton (pen)
23 October 1937	Grimsby Town	A	1–2	10,308	Gillick
30 October 1937	Preston North End	H	3–5	26,250	Bell, Lawton (2)
6 November 1937	Middlesbrough	A	2–1	25,083	Lawton (2)
13 November 1937	Chelsea	H	4–1	29,930	Cunliffe, Lawton (2), Trentham
20 November 1937	West Bromwich Albion	A	1–3	20,920	Lawton (pen)
27 November 1937	Stoke City	H	3–0	27,661	Lawton (2), Stevenson
4 December 1937	Charlton Athletic	A	1–3	23,145	Cunliffe
11 December 1937	Birmingham City	H	1–1	17,018	Geldard
18 December 1937	Portsmouth	A	1–3	19,103	Trentham
25 December 1937	Leicester City	A	1–3	17,268	Trentham
27 December 1937	Leicester City	H	3–0	38,693	Lawton (2), Trentham
1 January 1938	Arsenal	A	1–2	36,953	Cunliffe
15 January 1938	Blackpool	H	3–1	22,219	Cunliffe, Lawton, Watson
26 January 1938	Brentford	A	0–3	16,917	
29 January 1938	Bolton Wanderers	H	4–1	25,848	Geldard, Gillick, Lawton, Stevenson
5 February 1938	Huddersfield Town	A	3–1	15,394	Cunliffe, Gillick, Stevenson
16 February 1938	Liverpool	H	1–3	33,465	Lawton
19 February 1938	Wolverhampton Wanderers	H	0–1	39,863	
26 February 1938	Leeds United	A	4–4	23,497	Cunliffe (2), Lawton (2)
5 March 1938	Grimsby Town	H	3–2	22,219	Lawton (2), Stevenson
12 March 1938	Preston North End	A	1–2	23,618	Cunliffe
19 March 1938	Middlesbrough	A	2–2	28,808	Bell, Boyes
26 March 1938	Chelsea	A	0–2	27,043	
2 April 1938	West Bromwich Albion	H	5–3	24,395	Cunliffe, Geldard, Lawton (2, 1 pen), Stevenson
9 April 1938	Stoke City	A	1–1	16,187	Lawton
15 April 1938	Sunderland	H	3–3	40,010	Cunliffe (2), Thomson
16 April 1938	Charlton Athletic	H	3–0	31,518	Geldard (2), Lawton (pen)
18 April 1938	Sunderland	A	0–2	22,332	
23 April 1938	Birmingham City	A	3–0	22,224	Boyes, Cunliffe, Stevenson
30 April 1938	Portsmouth	H	5–2	18,716	Boyes, Lawton, Stevenson (3)
7 May 1938	Derby County	H	1–1	18,291	Geldard

=== FA Cup ===
Round	Date	Opponent	Venue	Result	Goalscorers
3	8 January 1938	Chelsea	A	1–0	Stevenson
4	22 January 1938	Sunderland	H	0–1	

== Squad ==
Note: Flags indicate national team as defined under FIFA eligibility rules; some limited exceptions apply. Players may hold more than one non-FIFA nationality.

Pos.	Nation	Player
GK	ENG	Harry Morton
GK	ENG	Ted Sagar
DF	NIR	Billy Cook
DF	ENG	Charlie Gee
DF	ENG	Norman Greenhalgh
DF	ENG	George Jackson
DF	ENG	Jack Jones
DF	WAL	T. G. Jones
DF	ENG	Joe Mercer
MF	ENG	Cliff Britton
MF	ENG	Jackie Coulter
MF	SCO	Jock Thomson

Pos.	Nation	Player
MF	ENG	Gordon Watson
FW	ENG	Wally Boyes
FW	ENG	Bunny Bell
FW	ENG	Jimmy Cunliffe
FW	ENG	Dixie Dean
FW	SCO	Peter Dougall
FW	ENG	Albert Geldard
FW	SCO	Torry Gillick
FW	ENG	Tommy Lawton
FW	IRL	Alex Stevenson
FW	ENG	Douglas Trentham
