= Gordon Watson (footballer, born 1914) =

English footballer and coach

Personal information
- Full name: Thomas Gordon Watson
- Date of birth: 1 March 1914
- Place of birth: Wolsingham, England
- Date of death: 29 April 2001 (aged 87)
- Height: 5 ft 7 in (1.70 m)
- Position: Left half

Senior career*
Years	Team	Apps	(Gls)
- Blyth Spartans
1933–1948	Everton	61	(1)
- * Club domestic league appearances and goals

Thomas Gordon Watson (1 March 1914 – 29 April 2001) was an English football player and coach.

== Career ==
Born in Wolsingham, Watson began his career with Blyth Spartans. He played for Everton between 1933 and 1948, and was a coach at the club from 1948 to 1968.

== Career statistics ==
Appearances and goals by club, season and competition
Club	Season	League			FA Cup		Total	
Club	Season	Division	Apps	Goals	Apps	Goals	Apps	Goals
Everton	1936–37	First Division	2	0	0	0	2	0
Everton	1937–38	First Division	9	1	0	0	9	1
Everton	1938–39	First Division	16	0	1	0	17	0
Everton	1946–47	First Division	12	0	0	0	12	0
Everton	1947–48	First Division	18	0	4	0	22	0
Everton	1948–49	First Division	4	0	0	0	4	0
Career total			61	1	5	0	66	1
