= 1948–49 Everton F.C. season =

English football club season

Everton
1948–49 season
- Manager: Theo Kelly (until 1 September); Cliff Britton (from 11 October)
- Ground: Goodison Park
- First Division: 18th
- FA Cup: Fourth Round
- Top goalscorer: League: Eddie Wainwright (10); All: Eddie Wainwright (10)
Home colours

During the 1948–49 English football season, Everton F.C. competed in the Football League First Division.

In September 1948 Theo Kelly, the Everton manager, resigned reverting to his old job of club secretary with former player Cliff Britton returning to the club as manager.

== Final league table ==
Pos	Team	Pld	W	D	L	GF	GA	GAv	Pts
16	Blackpool	42	11	16	15	54	67	0.806	38
17	Birmingham City	42	11	15	16	36	38	0.947	37
18	Everton	42	13	11	18	41	63	0.651	37
19	Middlesbrough	42	11	12	19	46	57	0.807	34
20	Huddersfield Town	42	12	10	20	40	69	0.580	34

Source: World Football
Rules for classification: 1) Points; 2) Goal average; 3) Goals scored

== Results ==
Win	Draw	Loss

=== Football League First Division ===
Date	Opponent	Venue	Result FT (HT)	Attendance	Scorers
21 August 1948	Newcastle United	H	3–3 (2–2)	57,729	Dodds 2, Powell
25 August 1948	Portsmouth	A	0–4 (0–2)	31,433	-
28 August 1948	Middlesbrough	A	0–1 (0–1)	35,960	-
1 September 1948	Portsmouth	H	0–5 (0–3)	41,511	-
4 September 1948	Birmingham City	H	0–5 (0–2)	49,199	-
8 September 1948	Stoke City	H	2–1 (1–1)	42,818	Juliussen, Powell
11 September 1948	Chelsea	A	0–6 (0–2)	42,736	–
13 September 1948	Stoke City	A	0–2 (0–0)	24,454	–
18 September 1948	Liverpool	H	1–1 (0–0)	78,299	Dodds
25 September 1948	Preston North End	H	4–1 (1–1)	48,674	Dodds 3, Stevenson
2 October 1948	Burnley	A	0–1 (0–0)	31,341	-
9 October 1948	Blackpool	A	0–3 (0–1)	22,070	-
16 October 1948	Derby County	H	0–1 (0–1)	53,087	–
23 October 1948	Arsenal	A	0–5 (0–2)	49,048	-
30 October 1948	Huddersfield Town	H	2–0 (1–0)	46,632	Catterick 2
6 November 1948	Manchester United	A	0–2 (0–1)	45,636	-
13 November 1948	Sheffield United	H	2–1 (1–0)	29,816	Bentham, Corr
20 November 1948	Aston Villa	A	1–0 (0–0)	43,382	Catterick
27 November 1948	Sunderland	H	1–0 (0–0)	38,170	opp. og
4 December 1948	Wolverhampton Wanderers	A	0–1 (0–1)	37,800	-
11 December 1948	Bolton Wanderers	H	1–0 (0–0)	40,407	Eglington
18 December 1948	Newcastle United	A	0–1 (0–0)	43,515	-
25 December 1948	Manchester City	H	0–0 (0–0)	37,444	-
27 December 1948	Manchester City	A	0–0 (0–0)	40,471	-
1 January 1949	Middlesbrough	H	3–1 (1–0)	39,445	Eglington 2, Stevenson
22 January 1949	Chelsea	H	2–1 (1–1)	52,700	Wainwright 2
5 February 1949	Liverpool	A	0–0 (0–0)	50,132	-
12 February 1949	Birmingham City	A	0–0 (0–0)	35,098	-
19 February 1949	Preston North End	A	1–3 (0–0)	34,496	Wainwright
26 February 1949	Burnley	H	2–1 (2–0)	34,568	Eglington 2
5 March 1949	Blackpool	H	5–0 (4–0)	25,548	Wainwright 4, McIntosh
12 March 1949	Derby County	A	2–3 (2–1)	33,120	Fielding, McIntosh
19 March 1949	Aston Villa	H	1–3 (1–1)	50,201	Wainwright
26 March 1949	Sunderland	A	1–1 (0–1)	36,226	McIntosh
2 April 1949	Charlton Athletic	A	1–3 (1–3)	28,529	Wainwright
9 April 1949	Sheffield United	A	1–1 (0–1)	29,473	McIntosh
16 April 1949	Arsenal	H	0–0 (0–0)	56,987	-
18 April 1949	Charlton Athletic	H	1–1 (0–0)	45,059	Eglington
23 April 1949	Huddersfield Town	A	1–1 (0–1)	19,051	Powell
27 April 1949	Manchester United	H	2–0 (2–0)	39,106	McIntosh, Wainwright
4 May 1949	Wolverhampton Wanderers	H	1–0 (1–0)	40,488	Eglington
7 May 1949	Bolton Wanderers	A	0–1 (0–1)	22,725	-

=== FA Cup ===
Round	Date	Opponent	Venue	Result	Attendance	Goalscorers
3	8 January 1949	Manchester City	H	1–0		Higgins
4	29 January 1949	Chelsea	N	0–2		

== Squad ==
Player	Lge Apps	League Goals	Cup Apps	Cup Goals
Stan Bentham	13	1	0	0
Wally Boyes	4	0	0	0
George Burnett	2	0	0	0
Daniel Cameron	1	0	0	0
Harry Catterick	10	3	1	0
Tommy Clinton	4	0	0	0
Peter Corr	10	1	0	0
Ephraim (Jock) Dodds	7	6	0	0
Gordon Dugdale	19	0	1	0
Tommy Eglington	34	7	2	0
Peter Farrell	38	0	2	0
Wally Fielding	36	1	2	0
Jackie Grant	7	0	1	0
Norman Greenhalgh	2	0	0	0
Jack Hedley	23	0	2	0
Billy Higgins	14	0	1	1
John (Jack) Humphreys	4	0	0	0
Tommy G Jones	37	0	2	0
Albert Juliussen	10	1	0	0
Cyril Lello	20	0	1	0
Maurice Lindley	11	1	1	0
Harry McCormick	4	0	0	0
John McIlhatton	5	0	1	0
Jimmy McIntosh	12	5	0	0
Aubrey Powell	19	3	0	0
Ted Sagar	40	0	2	0
George Saunders	36	0	1	0
Alex Stevenson	19	2	1	0
Eddie Wainwright	17	10	1	0
Gordon Watson	4	0	0	0
