= 1940–41 Blackpool F.C. season =

English football club season

Blackpool F.C.
1940–41 season
- Manager: Joe Smith
- North Regional League: 6th
- FA Cup: Competition suspended
- League War Cup: First round
- Top goalscorer: League: Jock Dodds (26); All: Jock Dodds (28)
Home colours

The 1940–41 season was Blackpool F.C.'s second season in special wartime football during World War II. They competed in the North Regional League, finishing sixth.

Jock Dodds was the club's top scorer for the third consecutive season, with 28 goals in all competitions. These don't count in official statistics, however.
