= TG Jones =

TG Jones can mean:

- T. G. Jones, a Welsh footballer (1917–2004)
- TGJones, a British retail company
