= 1938–39 Everton F.C. season =

English football club season

Everton
1938–39 season
- Manager: Run by Committee
- First Division: Champions
- FA Cup: Sixth Round
- Top goalscorer: League: Tommy Lawton (34); All: Tommy Lawton (38)
- Highest home attendance: 64,977 (vs. Liverpool, 1 October 1938)
- Lowest home attendance: 8,199 (vs. Leicester City, 8 March 1939)
- Biggest win: 8–0 (vs. Doncaster, 21 January 1939, FA Cup, 4th round)
- Biggest defeat: 7–0 (at Wolves, 22 February 1939, First Division)
colours	colours

In 1938–39, Everton won their fifth English title (and the last English top-flight title before World War II as the subsequent season was abandoned when Britain declared war on Germany on 3 September 1939). The club also competed in the FA Cup, advancing to the 6th round where they lost away to Wolves.

== League table ==
Pos	Team	Pld	W	D	L	GF	GA	GAv	Pts
1	Everton (C)	42	27	5	10	88	52	1.692	59
2	Wolverhampton Wanderers	42	22	11	9	88	39	2.256	55
3	Charlton Athletic	42	22	6	14	75	59	1.271	50
4	Middlesbrough	42	20	9	13	93	74	1.257	49
5	Arsenal	42	19	9	14	55	41	1.341	47

Source: World Football
Rules for classification: 1) Points; 2) Goal average; 3) Goals scored
(C) Champions

== Competitions ==
=== First Division ===
27 August 1938 1	Blackpool	0–2	Everton	Blackpool, Lancashire
3:15 p.m.			Stevenson 13'; Lawton 19'	Stadium: Bloomfield Road; Attendance: 29,647; Referee: E. Carnwell

31 August 1938 2	Everton	3–0	Grimsby Town	Walton, Liverpool
6:30 p.m.	Gillick 10'; Lawton 21', 24'			Stadium: Goodison Park; Attendance: 25,017; Referee: Dr. A. Barton

3 September 1938 3	Everton	2–1	Brentford	Walton, Liverpool
3:15 p.m.	Lawton 40', 82'		R. Reid 72'	Stadium: Goodison Park; Attendance: 35,989; Referee: I. Wright

5 September 1938 4	Aston Villa	0–3	Everton	Aston, Birmingham
6:00 p.m.			Stevenson 25', 70'; Lawton 40'	Stadium: Villa Park; Attendance: 34,105; Referee: E. Gough

10 September 1938 5	Arsenal	1–2	Everton	Highbury, London
3:30 p.m.	B. Jones 64'		Stevenson 14'; Lawton 38'	Stadium: Arsenal Stadium; Attendance: 64,555; Referee: H. Mee

17 September 1938 6	Everton	5–1	Portsmouth	Walton, Liverpool
3:15 p.m.	Bentham 17'; Lawton 31'; Gillick 62'; L. Morgan 72' (o.g.); Boyes 86'		W. Bagley 7'	Stadium: Goodison Park; Attendance: 43,913; Referee: A. Jewell

24 September 1938 7	Huddersfield Town	3–0	Everton	Huddersfield
3:15 p.m.	T. Hinchcliffe 50', 53'; J. Isaac 86'			Stadium: Leeds Road; Attendance: 27,710; Referee: H. Whitfield

1 October 1938 8	Everton	2–1	Liverpool	Walton, Liverpool
3:15 p.m.	Bentham 14'; Boyes 39'		W. Fagan 43'	Stadium: Goodison Park; Attendance: 64,977; Referee: H. Williams

8 October 1938 9	Everton	1–0	Wolves	Walton, Liverpool
3:15 p.m.	Lawton 28'			Stadium: Goodison Park; Attendance: 36,681; Referee: Dr. A. Barton

15 October 1938 10	Bolton	4–2	Everton	Burnden, Greater Manchester
3:00 p.m.	J. Roberts 12', 29', 82'; T. Woodward 77'		Stevenson 24'; Lawton 37'	Stadium: Burnden Park; Attendance: 57,989; Referee: G. Blackhall

22 October 1938 11	Everton	4–0	Leeds United	Walton, Liverpool
3:15 p.m.	D. Trentham 33'; Bell 41', 44', 52'			Stadium: Goodison Park; Attendance: 30,747; Referee: G. Davies

29 October 1938 12	Leicester City	3–0	Everton	Leicester
3:00 p.m.	A. Maw 26'; G. Dewis 76'; M. Griffiths 80'			Stadium: Filbert Street; Attendance: 23,964; Referee: L. Dale

5 November 1938 13	Everton	4–0	Middlesbrough	Walton, Liverpool
2:45 p.m.	Lawton 15', 21', 87' (pen.); Stevenson 80'			Stadium: Goodison Park; Attendance: 35,683; Referee: H. Rayner

12 November 1938 14	Birmingham City	1–0	Everton	Bordesley, Birmingham
2:40 p.m.	C. Phillips 43'			Stadium: St Andrew's; Attendance: 27,548; Referee: W. Lewington

19 November 1938 15	Everton	3–0	Manchester United	Walton, Liverpool
2:30 p.m.	Lawton 7', 53'; Gillick 65'			Stadium: Goodison Park; Attendance: 31,809; Referee: G. Salmon

26 November 1938 16	Stoke City	0–0	Everton	Stoke-on-Trent
2:30 p.m.				Stadium: Victoria Ground; Attendance: 26,725; Referee: W. Nixon

3 December 1938 17	Everton	4–1	Chelsea	Walton, Liverpool
2:15 p.m.	Lawton 57', 76'; Gillick 87'; Stevenson 89'		G. Mills 60'	Stadium: Goodison Park; Attendance: 27,959; Referee: J. Parker

10 December 1938 18	Preston North End	0–1	Everton	Deepdale, Preston
2:15 p.m.			Lawton 84'	Stadium: Deepdale; Attendance: 26,549; Referee: G. Hewitt

17 December 1938 19	Everton	1–4	Charlton Athletic	Walton, Liverpool
2:15 p.m.	Gillick 48'		J. Wilkinson 38'; G. Tadman 56', 89'; R. Brown 60'	Stadium: Goodison Park; Attendance: 22,053; Referee: H. Wright

24 December 1938 20	Everton	4–0	Blackpool	Walton, Liverpool
2:15 p.m.	Gillick 6'; Cunliffe 40', 73'; Cook 53'			Stadium: Goodison Park; Attendance: 24,040; Referee: E. Carnwell

26 December 1938 21	Everton	2–2	Derby County	Walton, Liverpool
2:15 p.m.	Cook 70' (pen.); Gillick 83'		D. McCulloch 48'; R. Dix 82'	Stadium: Goodison Park; Attendance: 55,401; Referee: F. Milner

27 December 1938 22	Derby County	2–1	Everton	Derby
2:15 p.m.	D. McCulloch 30' D. Duncan 51'		Cook 37' (pen.)	Stadium: Baseball Ground; Attendance: 35,683; Referee: F. Milner

31 December 1938 23	Brentford	2–0	Everton	Brentford, Greater London
2:30 p.m.	L. Townsend 18', 67'			Stadium: Griffin Park; Attendance: 27,861; Referee: I. Wright

14 January 1939 24	Everton	2–0	Arsenal	Walton, Liverpool
2:45 p.m.	Lawton 55'; Boyes 85'			Stadium: Goodison Park; Attendance: 47,178; Referee: H. Mee

28 January 1939 25	Everton	3–2	Huddersfield Town	Walton, Liverpool
3:00 p.m.	Cook 50' (pen.); Lawton 51'; Stevenson 67'		A. Beasley 46'; A. Price 82'	Stadium: Goodison Park; Attendance: 37,269; Referee: H. Whitfield

1 February 1939 26	Portsmouth	0–1	Everton	Portsmouth
3:00 p.m.			Lawton 53'	Stadium: Fratton Park; Attendance: 17,371; Referee: G. Gould

4 February 1939 27	Liverpool	0–3	Everton	Anfield, Liverpool
3:15 p.m.			Bentham 14'; Lawton 73', 82'	Stadium: Anfield; Attendance: 55,994; Referee: H. Williams

18 February 1939 28	Everton	2–1	Bolton	Walton, Liverpool
3:15 p.m.	Gillick 7'; H. Hubbick 35' (o.g.)		A. Geldard 17'	Stadium: Goodison Park; Attendance: 38,961; Referee: G. Blackhall

22 February 1939 29	Wolves	7–0	Everton	Wolverhampton
3:15 p.m.	D. Westcott 2', 85'; R. Dorsett 24', 37', 49', 78'; A. McIntosh 54'			Stadium: Molineux Stadium; Attendance: 39,774; Referee: W. Harper

25 February 1939 30	Leeds United	1–2	Everton	Leeds
3:15 p.m.	G. Ainsley 28'		Bentham 71'; Cunliffe 80'	Stadium: Elland Road; Attendance: 21,728; Referee: G. Davies

8 March 1939 31	Everton	4–0	Leicester City	Walton, Liverpool
3:15 p.m.	Stevenson 15'; Boyes 20'; N. Greenhalgh 48'; Lawton 89'			Stadium: Goodison Park; Attendance: 8,199; Referee: L. Dale

11 March 1939 32	Middlesbrough	4–4	Everton	Middlesbrough
3:00 p.m.	C. Chadwick 3'; B. Yorston 7'; J. Milne 32'; M. Fenton 39'		Lawton 37', 38', 49', 83'	Stadium: Ayresome Park; Attendance: 20,014; Referee: H. Rayner

18 March 1939 33	Everton	4–2	Birmingham City	Walton, Liverpool
3:15 p.m.	Lawton 27', 80'; Gillick 28'; Bentham 71'		F. Harris 26'; C. Jones 82'	Stadium: Goodison Park; Attendance: 29,687; Referee: W. Lewington

29 March 1939 34	Manchester United	0–2	Everton	Old Trafford, Greater Manchester
3:00 p.m.			Lawton 40'; Gillick 69'	Stadium: Old Trafford; Attendance: 18,348; Referee: G. Salmon

1 April 1939 35	Everton	1–1	Stoke City	Walton, Liverpool
3:15 p.m.	Lawton 76'		T. Sale 62'	Stadium: Goodison Park; Attendance: 38,601; Referee: W. Nixon

7 April 1939 36	Sunderland	1–2	Everton	Roker, Sunderland
2:45 p.m.	L. Duns 15'		Lawton 2'; Gillick 17'	Stadium: Roker Park; Attendance: 40,521; Referee: J. Mellor

8 April 1939 37	Chelsea	0–2	Everton	Fulham, London
3:30 p.m.			Stevenson 68'; Gillick 70'	Stadium: Stamford Bridge; Attendance: 51,481; Referee: J. Parker

10 April 1939 38	Everton	6–2	Sunderland	Walton, Liverpool
3:15 p.m.	Bentham 12', 36', 80'; Stevenson 50'; J. Caskie 59'; Lawton 61'		A. Housam 44'; L. Duns 89'	Stadium: Goodison Park; Attendance: 46,016; Referee: J. Mellor

15 April 1939 39	Everton	0–0	Preston North End	Walton, Liverpool
3:15 p.m.				Stadium: Goodison Park; Attendance: 31,987; Referee: G. Hewitt

22 April 1939 40	Charlton Athletic	2–1	Everton	Charlton, London
3:30 p.m.	H. Hobbles 1'; G. Robinson 41'		Gillick 60'	Stadium: The Valley; Attendance: 26,338; Referee: H. Wright
Note: Everton clinch title with Wolves' draw at Bolton

29 April 1939 41	Everton	3–0	Aston Villa	Walton, Liverpool
3:15 p.m.	Bentham 11'; Gillick 23'; Cook 29' (pen.)			Stadium: Goodison Park; Attendance: 23,667; Referee: E. Gough

6 May 1939 42	Grimsby Town	3–0	Everton	Cleethorpes, Lincolnshire
3:15 p.m.	E. Glover 4', 75'; J. Boyd 88'			Stadium: Blundell Park; Attendance: 11,016; Referee: Dr. A. Barton

=== FA Cup ===
7 January 1939 3rd	Derby	0–1	Everton	Derby
2:30 p.m.		Report	Boyes 54'	Stadium: Baseball Ground; Attendance: 22,237; Referee: A. Jewell

21 January 1939 4th	Everton	8–0	Doncaster	Walton, Liverpool
2:45 p.m.	Boyes 35', 43'; Lawton 44', 49', 75', 87'; Stevenson 78'; Gillick 81'	Report		Stadium: Goodison Park; Attendance: 41,115; Referee: H. Wright

11 February 1939 5th	Birmingham City	2–2	Everton	Bordesley, Birmingham
3:00 p.m.	O. Madden 44', 81'	Report	Stevenson 45'; Boyes 61'	Stadium: St Andrew's; Attendance: 66,844; Referee: W. Daly

15 February 1939 5th (replay)	Everton	2–1	Birmingham City	Walton, Liverpool
3:00 p.m.	Gillick 2'; Cook 87' (pen.)	Report	F. Harris 4'	Stadium: Goodison Park; Attendance: 64,796; Referee: W. Daly

4 March 1939 6th	Wolves	2–0	Everton	Wolverhampton
3:00 p.m.	D. Westcott 41', 60'	Report		Stadium: Molineux Stadium; Attendance: 59,545; Referee: T. Thompson
