= George Taylor (footballer, born 1907) =

English footballer (1907–1951)

George Thomas Taylor
Personal information
- Full name: George Thomas Taylor
- Date of birth: 23 April 1907
- Place of birth: Walsall, England
- Date of death: 1951 (aged 43–44)
- Position: Winger

Senior career*
Years	Team	Apps	(Gls)
1922–1923	Walsall Wood		
1923–1924	Bloxwich Strollers		
1924–1925	Stourbridge		
1925–1933	Notts County	265	(46)
1933–1937	Bolton Wanderers	150	(27)
1937–1939	Coventry City	65	(11)
Total		480	(84)
- * Club domestic league appearances and goals

George Thomas Taylor (23 April 1907 – 1951) was an English footballer who played in the Football League for Bolton Wanderers, Coventry City and Notts County.
