= 1946–47 Everton F.C. season =

English football club season

Everton
1946–47 season
- Manager: Theo Kelly
- Ground: Goodison Park
- First Division: 10th
- FA Cup: Fourth Round
- Top goalscorer: League: Jock Dodds (17); All: Jock Dodds (17)
Home colours	Away colours

During the 1946–47 English football season, Everton F.C. competed in the Football League First Division.

== Final league table ==
Pos	Team	Pld	W	D	L	GF	GA	GAv	Pts
8	Aston Villa	42	18	9	15	67	53	1.264	45
9	Sunderland	42	18	8	16	65	66	0.985	44
10	Everton	42	17	9	16	62	67	0.925	43
11	Middlesbrough	42	17	8	17	73	68	1.074	42
12	Portsmouth	42	16	9	17	66	60	1.100	41

Source: World Football
Rules for classification: 1) Points; 2) Goal average; 3) Goals scored

== Results ==
Win	Draw	Loss

=== Football League First Division ===
Date	Opponent	Venue	Result	Attendance	Scorers
31 August 1946	Brentford	H	0–2 (0–1)	55,338	-
2 September 1946	Aston Villa	A	1–0 (0–0)	35,618	Boyes 50'
7 September 1946	Blackburn Rovers	A	1–4 (1–1)	25,678	Boyes 13'
11 September 1946	Arsenal	H	3–2 (1–1)	40,093	Bentham 29', Livingstone 47', 58'
14 September 1946	Portsmouth	H	1–0 (0–0)	47,909	Bentham 50'
21 September 1946	Liverpool	A	0–0 (0–0)	49,875	-
28 September 1946	Huddersfield Town	A	0–1 (0–0)	19,208	-
5 October 1946	Wolverhampton Wanderers	H	0–2 (0–1)	44,792	-
12 October 1946	Sunderland	A	1–4 (0–1)	40,830	Eglington 49'
19 October 1946	Bolton Wanderers	H	2–1 (1–0)	45,104	Stevenson 44', Higgins 59'
26 October 1946	Charlton Athletic	A	1–4 (1–2)	25,211	Stevenson 22'
2 November 1946	Grimsby Town	H	3–3 (1–2)	48,817	Dodds 37', Jones 50', Stevenson 63'
9 November 1946	Leeds United	A	1–2 (0–1)	22,992	Dodds 62'
16 November 1946	Manchester United	A	2–2 (2–2)	45,932	Dodds 3', 14'
23 November 1946	Stoke City	H	1–2 (1–0)	27,948	Dodds 33'
30 November 1946	Middlesbrough	H	2–1 (0–0)	48,997	Wainwright 77', Eglington 79'
7 December 1946	Chelsea	A	1–1 (1–0)	41,255	Dodds 23'
14 December 1946	Sheffield United	H	2–3 (1–0)	36,513	Dodds 5', Jones 56'
21 December 1946	Preston North End	A	1–2 (1–2)	23,334	Jones 44'(pen)
25 December 1946	Derby County	H	4–1 (?-?)	32,915	Wainwright 46', ??', Boyes 48' (pen), Dodds ??'
26 December 1946	Derby County	A	1–5 (1–4)	29,978	Fielding 16'
28 December 1946	Brentford	A	1–1 (0–1)	29,360	Wainwright 77'
1 January 1947	Aston Villa	H	2–0 (0–0)	49,665	Stevenson 51', Dodds 75'
4 January 1947	Blackburn Rovers	H	1–0 (1–0)	39,775	Wainwright 44'
18 January 1947	Portsmouth	A	1–2 (1–0)	30,002	Ferrier (og) 53'
29 January 1947	Liverpool	H	1–0 (0–0)	30,612	Wainwright 59'
1 February 1947	Huddersfield Town	H	1–0 (1–0)	37,205	Bentham 35'
15 February 1947	Sunderland	H	4–2 (1–2)	39,658	Wainwright 9', 51', 75', Eglington 80'
22 February 1947	Bolton Wanderers	A	2–0 (1–0)	21,080	Wainwright 15', Stevenson 80'
8 March 1947	Grimsby Town	A	2–2 (1–2)	11,227	Wainwright 38', 52'
22 March 1947	Manchester United	A	0–3 (0–1)	44,297	-
29 March 1947	Stoke City	H	2–2 (0–2)	40,092	Eglington 61', Fielding 67'
4 April 1947	Blackpool	H	1–1 (1–0)	63,617	Stevenson 6'
5 April 1947	Middlesbrough	A	0–4 (0–1)	27,106	-
7 April 1947	Blackpool	A	3–0 (2–0)	23,699	Dodds 5', 73', Stevenson 44'
12 April 1947	Chelsea	H	2–0 (0–0)	30,970	Dodds 56', 68'
19 April 1947	Sheffield United	A	0–2 (0–2)	28,675	-
26 April 1947	Preston North End	H	2–0 (1–0)	26,371	Dodds 7', Fielding 57'
10 May 1947	Wolverhampton Wanderers	A	3–2 (1–1)	40,033	McIlhatton 2', Dodds 50', Fielding 57'
24 May 1947	Charlton Athletic	H	1–1 (1–0)	32,558	Wainwright 4'
26 May 1947	Leeds United	H	4–1 (2–1)	21,001	Grant 15', Dodds 43', 56', Stevenson 58'
31 May 1947	Arsenal	A	1–2 (1–1)	23,785	Eglington 23'

=== FA Cup ===
Round	Date	Opponent	Venue	Result	Attendance	Goalscorers
3	11 January 1947	Southend United	H	4–2 (2-1)	50,124	Jones 29', Wainwright 32', 64', Fielding 67'
4	24 January 1948	Sheffield Wednesday	A	1–2 (1-2)	62,250	Wainwright 25'
