= Willie Miller (footballer, born 1910) =

Scottish footballer

Personal information
- Full name: William Rennie Miller
- Date of birth: 19 January 1910
- Place of birth: Camelon, Scotland
- Date of death: 20 February 1978 (aged 68)
- Place of death: Falkirk, Scotland
- Height: 5 ft 8 in (1.73 m)
- Position: Inside forward

Youth career
- Alva Albion Rangers

Senior career*
Years	Team	Apps	(Gls)
1929–1935	Partick Thistle	123	(27)
1935–1936	Everton	16	(2)
1936–1938	Burnley	74	(18)
1938–1939	Tranmere Rovers	11	(1)
1939–1942	Falkirk	10	(0)
1942–1943	→ Airdrieonians (wartime)		
1946–1947	Dumbarton	3	(0)

International career
1934	Scottish Football League XI	1	(0)
- * Club domestic league appearances and goals

William Rennie Miller (19 January 1910 – 20 February 1978) was a Scottish professional footballer who played as an inside forward. He was nicknamed 'Golden Miller', after a famous racehorse of the time.
