= 1938–39 in English football =

Football in England
- Season: 1938–39

Men's football
- Football League: Everton
- Football League Second Division: Blackburn Rovers
- FA Cup: Portsmouth

The 1938–39 season was the 64th season of competitive football in England. It was the last completed season before the Second World War.

== Honours ==
| Competition | Winner | Runner-up |
|---|---|---|
| First Division | Everton (5) | Wolverhampton Wanderers |
| Second Division | Blackburn Rovers | Sheffield United |
| Third Division North | Barnsley | Doncaster Rovers |
| Third Division South | Newport County | Crystal Palace |
| FA Cup | Portsmouth (1) | Wolverhampton Wanderers |
| Charity Shield | Arsenal | Preston North End |
| Home Championship | England | |

Notes = Number in parentheses is the times that club has won that honour. * indicates new record for competition

== Football League ==
=== First Division ===
| Pos | Team | Pld | W | D | L | GF | GA | GAv | Pts | Relegation |
|---|---|---|---|---|---|---|---|---|---|---|
| 1 | Everton (C) | 42 | 27 | 5 | 10 | 88 | 52 | 1.692 | 59 | |
| 2 | Wolverhampton Wanderers | 42 | 22 | 11 | 9 | 88 | 39 | 2.256 | 55 | |
| 3 | Charlton Athletic | 42 | 22 | 6 | 14 | 75 | 59 | 1.271 | 50 | |
| 4 | Middlesbrough | 42 | 20 | 9 | 13 | 93 | 74 | 1.257 | 49 | |
| 5 | Arsenal | 42 | 19 | 9 | 14 | 55 | 41 | 1.341 | 47 | |
| 6 | Derby County | 42 | 19 | 8 | 15 | 66 | 55 | 1.200 | 46 | |
| 7 | Stoke City | 42 | 17 | 12 | 13 | 71 | 68 | 1.044 | 46 | |
| 8 | Bolton Wanderers | 42 | 15 | 15 | 12 | 67 | 58 | 1.155 | 45 | |
| 9 | Preston North End | 42 | 16 | 12 | 14 | 63 | 59 | 1.068 | 44 | |
| 10 | Grimsby Town | 42 | 16 | 11 | 15 | 61 | 69 | 0.884 | 43 | |
| 11 | Liverpool | 42 | 14 | 14 | 14 | 62 | 63 | 0.984 | 42 | |
| 12 | Aston Villa | 42 | 16 | 9 | 17 | 71 | 60 | 1.183 | 41 | |
| 13 | Leeds United | 42 | 16 | 9 | 17 | 59 | 67 | 0.881 | 41 | |
| 14 | Manchester United | 42 | 11 | 16 | 15 | 57 | 65 | 0.877 | 38 | |
| 15 | Blackpool | 42 | 12 | 14 | 16 | 56 | 68 | 0.824 | 38 | |
| 16 | Sunderland | 42 | 13 | 12 | 17 | 54 | 67 | 0.806 | 38 | |
| 17 | Portsmouth | 42 | 12 | 13 | 17 | 47 | 70 | 0.671 | 37 | |
| 18 | Brentford | 42 | 14 | 8 | 20 | 53 | 74 | 0.716 | 36 | |
| 19 | Huddersfield Town | 42 | 12 | 11 | 19 | 58 | 64 | 0.906 | 35 | |
| 20 | Chelsea | 42 | 12 | 9 | 21 | 64 | 80 | 0.800 | 33 | |
| 21 | Birmingham (R) | 42 | 12 | 8 | 22 | 62 | 84 | 0.738 | 32 | Relegation to the Second Division |
| 22 | Leicester City (R) | 42 | 9 | 11 | 22 | 48 | 82 | 0.585 | 29 | Relegation to the Second Division |

Source: World Football
Rules for classification: 1) Points; 2) Goal average; 3) Goals scored
(C) Champions; (R) Relegated

=== Second Division ===
| Pos | Team | Pld | W | D | L | GF | GA | GAv | Pts | Promotion or relegation |
|---|---|---|---|---|---|---|---|---|---|---|
| 1 | Blackburn Rovers (C, P) | 42 | 25 | 5 | 12 | 94 | 60 | 1.567 | 55 | Promotion to the First Division |
| 2 | Sheffield United (P) | 42 | 20 | 14 | 8 | 69 | 41 | 1.683 | 54 | Promotion to the First Division |
| 3 | Sheffield Wednesday | 42 | 21 | 11 | 10 | 88 | 59 | 1.492 | 53 | |
| 4 | Coventry City | 42 | 21 | 8 | 13 | 62 | 45 | 1.378 | 50 | |
| 5 | Manchester City | 42 | 21 | 7 | 14 | 96 | 72 | 1.333 | 49 | |
| 6 | Chesterfield | 42 | 20 | 9 | 13 | 69 | 52 | 1.327 | 49 | |
| 7 | Luton Town | 42 | 22 | 5 | 15 | 82 | 66 | 1.242 | 49 | |
| 8 | Tottenham Hotspur | 42 | 19 | 9 | 14 | 67 | 62 | 1.081 | 47 | |
| 9 | Newcastle United | 42 | 18 | 10 | 14 | 61 | 48 | 1.271 | 46 | |
| 10 | West Bromwich Albion | 42 | 18 | 9 | 15 | 89 | 72 | 1.236 | 45 | |
| 11 | West Ham United | 42 | 17 | 10 | 15 | 70 | 52 | 1.346 | 44 | |
| 12 | Fulham | 42 | 17 | 10 | 15 | 61 | 55 | 1.109 | 44 | |
| 13 | Millwall | 42 | 14 | 14 | 14 | 64 | 53 | 1.208 | 42 | |
| 14 | Burnley | 42 | 15 | 9 | 18 | 50 | 56 | 0.893 | 39 | |
| 15 | Plymouth Argyle | 42 | 15 | 8 | 19 | 49 | 55 | 0.891 | 38 | |
| 16 | Bury | 42 | 12 | 13 | 17 | 65 | 74 | 0.878 | 37 | |
| 17 | Bradford (Park Avenue) | 42 | 12 | 11 | 19 | 61 | 82 | 0.744 | 35 | |
| 18 | Southampton | 42 | 13 | 9 | 20 | 56 | 82 | 0.683 | 35 | |
| 19 | Swansea Town | 42 | 11 | 12 | 19 | 50 | 83 | 0.602 | 34 | |
| 20 | Nottingham Forest | 42 | 10 | 11 | 21 | 49 | 82 | 0.598 | 31 | |
| 21 | Norwich City (R) | 42 | 13 | 5 | 24 | 50 | 91 | 0.549 | 31 | Relegation to the Third Division South |
| 22 | Tranmere Rovers (R) | 42 | 6 | 5 | 31 | 39 | 99 | 0.394 | 17 | Relegation to the Third Division North |

Rules for classification: 1) Points; 2) Goal average; 3) Goals scored
(C) Champions; (P) Promoted; (R) Relegated

=== Third Division North ===
| Pos | Team | Pld | W | D | L | GF | GA | GAv | Pts | Promotion or relegation |
|---|---|---|---|---|---|---|---|---|---|---|
| 1 | Barnsley (C, P) | 42 | 30 | 7 | 5 | 94 | 34 | 2.765 | 67 | Promotion to the Second Division |
| 2 | Doncaster Rovers | 42 | 21 | 14 | 7 | 87 | 47 | 1.851 | 56 | |
| 3 | Bradford City | 42 | 22 | 8 | 12 | 89 | 56 | 1.589 | 52 | |
| 4 | Southport | 42 | 20 | 10 | 12 | 75 | 54 | 1.389 | 50 | |
| 5 | Oldham Athletic | 42 | 22 | 5 | 15 | 76 | 59 | 1.288 | 49 | |
| 6 | Chester | 42 | 20 | 9 | 13 | 88 | 70 | 1.257 | 49 | |
| 7 | Hull City | 42 | 18 | 10 | 14 | 83 | 74 | 1.122 | 46 | |
| 8 | Crewe Alexandra | 42 | 19 | 6 | 17 | 82 | 70 | 1.171 | 44 | |
| 9 | Stockport County | 42 | 17 | 9 | 16 | 91 | 77 | 1.182 | 43 | |
| 10 | Gateshead | 42 | 14 | 14 | 14 | 74 | 67 | 1.104 | 42 | |
| 11 | Rotherham United | 42 | 17 | 8 | 17 | 64 | 64 | 1.000 | 42 | |
| 12 | Halifax Town | 42 | 13 | 16 | 13 | 52 | 54 | 0.963 | 42 | |
| 13 | Barrow | 42 | 16 | 9 | 17 | 66 | 65 | 1.015 | 41 | |
| 14 | Wrexham | 42 | 17 | 7 | 18 | 66 | 79 | 0.835 | 41 | |
| 15 | Rochdale | 42 | 15 | 9 | 18 | 92 | 82 | 1.122 | 39 | |
| 16 | New Brighton | 42 | 15 | 9 | 18 | 68 | 73 | 0.932 | 39 | |
| 17 | Lincoln City | 42 | 12 | 9 | 21 | 66 | 92 | 0.717 | 33 | |
| 18 | Darlington | 42 | 13 | 7 | 22 | 62 | 92 | 0.674 | 33 | |
| 19 | Carlisle United | 42 | 13 | 7 | 22 | 66 | 111 | 0.595 | 33 | |
| 20 | York City | 42 | 12 | 8 | 22 | 64 | 92 | 0.696 | 32 | |
| 21 | Hartlepools United | 42 | 12 | 7 | 23 | 55 | 94 | 0.585 | 31 | Re-elected |
| 22 | Accrington Stanley | 42 | 7 | 6 | 29 | 49 | 103 | 0.476 | 20 | Re-elected |

Source: rsssf.com
(C) Champions; (P) Promoted

=== Third Division South ===
| Pos | Team | Pld | W | D | L | GF | GA | GAv | Pts | Promotion or relegation |
|---|---|---|---|---|---|---|---|---|---|---|
| 1 | Newport County (C, P) | 42 | 22 | 11 | 9 | 58 | 45 | 1.289 | 55 | Promotion to the Second Division |
| 2 | Crystal Palace | 42 | 20 | 12 | 10 | 71 | 52 | 1.365 | 52 | |
| 3 | Brighton & Hove Albion | 42 | 19 | 11 | 12 | 68 | 49 | 1.388 | 49 | |
| 4 | Watford | 42 | 17 | 12 | 13 | 62 | 51 | 1.216 | 46 | |
| 5 | Reading | 42 | 16 | 14 | 12 | 69 | 59 | 1.169 | 46 | |
| 6 | Queens Park Rangers | 42 | 15 | 14 | 13 | 68 | 49 | 1.388 | 44 | |
| 7 | Ipswich Town | 42 | 16 | 12 | 14 | 62 | 52 | 1.192 | 44 | |
| 8 | Bristol City | 42 | 16 | 12 | 14 | 61 | 63 | 0.968 | 44 | |
| 9 | Swindon Town | 42 | 18 | 8 | 16 | 72 | 77 | 0.935 | 44 | |
| 10 | Aldershot | 42 | 16 | 12 | 14 | 53 | 66 | 0.803 | 44 | |
| 11 | Notts County | 42 | 17 | 9 | 16 | 59 | 54 | 1.093 | 43 | |
| 12 | Southend United | 42 | 16 | 9 | 17 | 61 | 64 | 0.953 | 41 | |
| 13 | Cardiff City | 42 | 15 | 11 | 16 | 61 | 65 | 0.938 | 41 | |
| 14 | Exeter City | 42 | 13 | 14 | 15 | 65 | 82 | 0.793 | 40 | |
| 15 | Bournemouth & Boscombe Athletic | 42 | 13 | 13 | 16 | 52 | 58 | 0.897 | 39 | |
| 16 | Mansfield Town | 42 | 12 | 15 | 15 | 44 | 62 | 0.710 | 39 | |
| 17 | Northampton Town | 42 | 15 | 8 | 19 | 51 | 58 | 0.879 | 38 | |
| 18 | Port Vale | 42 | 14 | 9 | 19 | 52 | 58 | 0.897 | 37 | |
| 19 | Torquay United | 42 | 14 | 9 | 19 | 54 | 70 | 0.771 | 37 | |
| 20 | Clapton Orient | 42 | 11 | 13 | 18 | 53 | 55 | 0.964 | 35 | |
| 21 | Walsall | 42 | 11 | 11 | 20 | 68 | 69 | 0.986 | 33 | Re-elected |
| 22 | Bristol Rovers | 42 | 10 | 13 | 19 | 55 | 61 | 0.902 | 33 | Re-elected |

(C) Champions; (P) Promoted

=== Top goalscorers ===
First Division

- Tommy Lawton (Everton) – 35 goals

Second Division

- Hugh Billington (Luton Town) – 28 goals

Third Division North

- Wally Hunt (Carlisle United) – 32 goals

Third Division South

- Ben Morton (Swindon Town) – 28 goals
