= Jack Humphreys =

Welsh footballer

Personal information
- Full name: John Vaughan Humphreys
- Date of birth: 13 January 1920
- Place of birth: Llandudno, Wales
- Date of death: 21 September 1954 (aged 34)
- Place of death: Caernarfon, Wales
- Position: Defender

Youth career
- Friars School
- 1936–????: Bolton Wanderers

Senior career*
Years	Team	Apps	(Gls)
1945	Llandudno		
1945–1951	Everton	53	(0)
1951	Llandudno		

International career
1947	Wales	1	(0)
- * Club domestic league appearances and goals

Jack Humphreys (13 January 1920 – 21 September 1954) was a Welsh international footballer who played as a defender for Everton. He was part of the Wales national football team, playing 1 match on 16 April 1947 against Ireland.

== Playing career ==
In November 1936 it was reported he had signed Amateur forms for Bolton Wanderers having scored 37 goals in 5 games for Friars School in Bangor.

In 1945 he signed for Everton from Llandudno.

== Death ==
Humphreys died in Caernarfon sanitorium in September 1954 at the age of 34.

== See also ==
- List of Wales international footballers (alphabetical)
