= Jock Dodds =

Scottish footballer (1915–2007)

Personal information
- Full name: Ephraim Dodds
- Date of birth: 7 September 1915
- Place of birth: Grangemouth, Scotland
- Date of death: 23 February 2007 (aged 91)
- Place of death: Blackpool, England
- Height: 5 ft 11 1/2 in (1.82 m)
- Position: Centre forward

Youth career
- Medomsley Juniors

Senior career*
Years	Team	Apps	(Gls)
1932–1934	Huddersfield Town	0	(0)
1934	Lincoln City	0	(0)
1934–1939	Sheffield United	178	(113)
1939–1946	Blackpool	15	(13)
1946	Shamrock Rovers	0	(0)
1946–1948	Everton	55	(36)
1948–1950	Lincoln City	60	(39)
Total		308	(201)

International career
1939–1946	Scotland (wartime)	8	(9)
- * Club domestic league appearances and goals

Ephraim "Jock" Dodds (7 September 1915 – 23 February 2007) was a Scottish professional footballer. He played in the 1936 FA Cup final, and, at the time of his death was the oldest surviving player to have played in a final at Wembley Stadium.

== Club career ==
Dodds was born in Grangemouth. His father died when he was two years old. His family moved to Durham in 1927 after his mother remarried. Four years later, at the age of 16, he began his career at First Division Huddersfield Town as a centre forward.

In 1934, after just two years with the Terriers, and via a short spell with Lincoln City, he took a free transfer to Second Division Sheffield United. Dodds later became the Blades' leading scorer for four successive seasons, netting a total of 130 goals in just 203 appearances.

His debut came on 15 September 1934, against Burnley but despite playing and scoring regularly in the following months, the club was unconvinced that he was yet of first-team quality. The club made an enquiry into the return of former player Jimmy Dunne, who found himself out of favour at Arsenal after he had been sold, but this came to nothing due to a cartilage injury. Dodds secured his position by scoring four goals in the next game, a 6–1 victory against Southampton on 16 February 1935. His prolific goalscoring helped the club reach the 1936 FA Cup Final, in which he almost scored, hitting the crossbar with a header. It was said by Ernest Jackson that he would have scored nine times out of ten from such a position and Dodds himself claimed that he had been pushed in the back by Wilf Copping. United ultimately lost the final to Arsenal, 1–0, thanks to a goal by Ted Drake.

His 100th league goal came in his 154th appearance, against Tottenham Hotspur on 12 September 1938. His last appearance for the Blades came against city rivals Sheffield Wednesday on 4 March 1939.

Dodds moved to First Division Blackpool in March 1939 for £10,000, citing family reasons as the source of his transfer request. At the time it was the second highest transfer fee, to the record fee of £14,000 paid to Wolverhampton Wanderers by Arsenal for Bryn Jones. Dodds agreed terms of £6 a week plus a £2 bonus for every first-team appearance.

On his move to Blackpool Dodds later said, "It was a lovely sunny day and after the sooty streets of Sheffield I remember thinking it was like coming to paradise." He made his Seasiders debut on 11 March 1939, in a defeat at Charlton Athletic, scoring Blackpool's only goal. He went on to score four in a home win over Middlesbrough and quickly became a favourite. The Second World War intervened, and the Football League programme was abandoned. Dodds joined the Royal Air Force, and was stationed in Blackpool as a PT instructor sergeant. He continued to play for Blackpool, with most of his goals in the war years coming in regional competitions. In the North Regional League, he scored 65 goals in 1941–2, and then 47 goals in 1942–3. In 1943, Blackpool beat Sheffield Wednesday over two legs to win the League Cup North, and then defeated League Cup South champions Arsenal 4–2 in the 1943 Football League War Cup final. He scored eight goals against Stockport County in 1941, and seven goals against Tranmere Rovers in 1942, including a hat-trick in just 2 1/2 minutes. For over 60 years it stood as the fastest hat-trick in the Football League, before James Hayter bettered it by ten seconds in 2004.

During World War II, Dodds played guest matches for Manchester United, Fulham and West Ham United. He also made one guest appearance for Clapton Orient, against Queens Park Rangers on 14 October 1944. Orient lost 0–3 before 3,000 spectators.

In seven years at Bloomfield Road, Dodds scored well over 200 goals, including 66 in 1941-2 alone.

He signed for Irish side Shamrock Rovers in August 1946 and scored twice on his debut at Milltown on 8 September . In total he played five games, two in the Dublin City Cup and three in the League of Ireland Shield scoring four goals before being sold to Everton in November 1946 for £7,750 . Everton were in desperate need of a centre forward after Dixie Dean retired and Tommy Lawton moved to Chelsea. Dodds scored 36 goals in 55 league appearances for the Toffees in 1946–8. He was sold to his former club Lincoln City in October 1948 for £6,000, where he ended his playing career.

== International career ==
Dodds made all eight of his international appearances for Scotland during the wartime period, and thus they are unofficial. On 18 April 1942, he netted a hat-trick in a 5–4 win over England at Hampden Park in front of a crowd of 91,000. Bill Shankly hit Scotland's winning goal. Dodds scored 8 goals in his 6 games versus England.

== Post-retirement ==
After retiring as a player, he tried to recruit players to go to Bogotá, to play in a new league outside FIFA control. He was banned by the Football Association in July 1950 for bringing the game into disrepute, but was later cleared. He decided against taking up positions in football management, and concentrated on business interests in Blackpool, where he said of the town in 1989, "I have lived here ever since [his move from Sheffield in 1939] and love the place."

On 22 February 1989 Dodds was given a certificate for his two-and-a-half-minute hat-trick against Tranmere Rovers in 1942, which had for many years been listed in the Guinness Book of Records. "I have been listed in the Guinness Book of Records for years but I never thought about a certificate until I read about a woman receiving one for being the oldest golfer to hit a hole in one. A friend wrote to the GBR asking if I could have a certificate and they sent one to me."

Dodds' wife died in 2005, and he died two years later, on 24 February 2007 at Blackpool's Victoria Hospital. At the time of his death he was the oldest living FA Cup finalist, aged 91.

== Blackpool F.C. Hall of Fame ==
Dodds was inducted into the Hall of Fame at Bloomfield Road, when it was officially opened by former Blackpool player Jimmy Armfield in April 2006. Organised by the Blackpool Supporters Association, Blackpool fans around the world voted on their all-time heroes. Five players from each decade are inducted; Dodds is in the 'pre-1950s'.

== Career statistics ==
=== Sheffield United ===
Club	Season	Division	League Apps	League Goals	FA Cup Apps	FA Cup Goals	Other Apps	Other Goals	Total Apps	Total Goals
Sheffield United	1934–35	Division Two	28	19	0	0	2	0	30	19
Sheffield United	1935–36	Division Two	42	33	8	4	2	3	52	40
Sheffield United	1936–37	Division Two	39	23	3	4	2	1	44	28
Sheffield United	1937–38	Division Two	40	21	3	1	1	1	44	23
Sheffield United	1938–39	Division Two	29	17	3	1	1	2	33	20
Sheffield United	Total		178	113	17	10	8	7	203	130
Everton	1946–47	Division One	21	17	2	0			23	17
Everton	1947–48	Division One	27	13	1	1			28	14
Everton	1948–49	Division One	7	6		0			7	6
Everton	Total		55	36	3	1			58	37

== Honours ==
Sheffield United

- FA Cup runner-up: 1935–36

== See also ==
- List of men's footballers with 500 or more goals
