= Llewellyn Davies =

English cricketer

Llewellyn John Davies (17 May 1894 – 28 October 1965) was an English cricketer who played for Northamptonshire between 1919 and 1921. He was born in Northampton on 17 May 1894 and died in Birmingham on 28 October 1965. He appeared in six first-class matches as a right-handed batsman, scoring 43 runs with a highest score of 20 and took two wickets with a best performance of one for 9.
