= 1947–48 Everton F.C. season =

English football club season

Everton
1947–48 season
- Manager: Theo Kelly
- Ground: Goodison Park
- First Division: 14th
- FA Cup: Fifth Round
- Top goalscorer: League: Jock Dodds (13); All: Jock Dodds (14)
Home colours	Away colours

During the 1947–48 English football season, Everton F.C. competed in the Football League First Division.

== League table ==
Pos	Team	Pld	W	D	L	GF	GA	GAv	Pts
12	Sheffield United	42	16	10	16	65	70	0.929	42
13	Charlton Athletic	42	17	6	19	57	66	0.864	40
14	Everton	42	17	6	19	52	66	0.788	40
15	Stoke City	42	14	10	18	41	55	0.745	38
16	Middlesbrough	42	14	9	19	71	73	0.973	37

Source: World Football
Rules for classification: 1) Points; 2) Goal average; 3) Goals scored

== Results ==
Win	Draw	Loss

=== Football League First Division ===
Date	Opponent	Venue	Result	Attendance	Scorers
23 August 1947	Blackburn Rovers	A	3–2	24,536	Dodds, Eglington, Wainwright
27 August 1947	Manchester City	H	1–0	53,822	Fielding
30 August 1947	Blackpool	H	1–2	59,865	Wainwright
3 September 1947	Manchester City	A	1–0	46,462	Stevenson
6 September 1947	Derby County	A	0–1	29,089	-
8 September 1947	Aston Villa	A	0–3	28,764	-
13 September 1947	Huddersfield Town	H	1–1	40,822	Wainwright
17 September 1947	Aston Villa	H	3–0	32,637	Fielding 2, opp og
20 September 1947	Chelsea	A	1–3	42,955	Catterick
27 September 1947	Liverpool	H	0–3	66,776	-
4 October 1947	Wolverhampton Wanderers	H	1–1	48,306	Boyes
11 October 1947	Middlesbrough	A	1–0	38,686	Wainwright
18 October 1947	Charlton Athletic	H	0–1	40,377	
25 October 1947	Arsenal	A	1–1	56,645	Wainwright
1 November 1947	Sheffield United	H	2–0	43,615	Dodds, Fielding
8 November 1947	Stoke City	H	1–1	32,232	Stevenson
15 November 1947	Burnley	H	0–3	49,642	-
22 November 1947	Manchester United	A	2–2	36,715	Dodds, Fielding
29 November 1947	Preston North End	H	2–1	45,084	Fielding, Wainwright
6 December 1947	Portsmouth	A	0–3	25,525	-
13 December 1947	Bolton Wanderers	H	2–0	33,658	Catterick, Wainwright
20 December 1947	Blackburn Rovers	H	4–1	32,655	Fielding 2, Farrell, Grant
25 December 1947	Sunderland	A	0–2	40,925	-
26 December 1947	Sunderland	H	3–0	47,828	Grant 2, Wainwright
3 January 1948	Blackpool	A	0–5	21,685	-
17 January 1948	Derby County	H	1–3	51,776	Wainwirght
21 February 1948	Wolverhampton Wanderers	A	4–2	24,105	Dodds 3, Eglington
28 February 1948	Middlesbrough	H	2–1	46,364	Lello 2
6 March 1948	Charlton Athletic	A	3–2	32,973	Dodds 2, Eglington
13 March 1948	Arsenal	H	0–2	64,059	-
20 March 1948	Sheffield United	A	1–2	30,284	Farrell
26 March 1948	Grimsby Town	A	0–3	18,279	-
27 March 1948	Stoke City	H	0–1	44,241	-
29 March 1948	Grimsby Town	H	3–1	37,926	Grant, Higgins, Jones
3 April 1948	Burnley	A	1–0	23,933	Dodds
10 April 1948	Manchester United	H	2–0	44,198	Dodds, Stevenson
14 April 1948	Chelsea	H	2–3	28,366	Higgins 2
17 April 1948	Preston North End	A	0–3	25,035	-
21 April 1948	Liverpool	A	0–4	55,305	-
24 April 1948	Portsmouth	H	0–2	18,089	-
28 April 1948	Huddersfield Town	A	3–1	13,905	Dodds 3
1 May 1948	Bolton Wanderers	A	0–0	17,391	-

=== FA Cup ===
Round	Date	Opponent	Venue	Result FT (HT)	Attendance	Goalscorers
3	10 January 1948	Grimsby Town	A	4–1 (0–0)	19,000	Wainwright 51', 80', Farrell 62', Dodds 78'
4	24 January 1948	Wolverhampton Wanderers	A	1–1aet (0–0)	45,085	Catterick 80'
4:R	31 January 1948	Wolverhampton Wanderers	H	3–2aet (0–1)	72,569	Fielding 61', 106', Grant 90'
5	7 February 1948	Fulham	A	1–1aet (1–0)	37,500	Eglington 41'
5:R	14 February 1948	Fulham	H	0–1 (0–0)	71,587	-
