= Tommy Clinton =

Irish footballer

Personal information
- Full name: Thomas Joseph Clinton
- Date of birth: 13 April 1926
- Place of birth: Dublin, Ireland
- Date of death: 9 August 2009 (aged 83)
- Position: Defender

Senior career*
Years	Team	Apps	(Gls)
1947–1948	Dundalk	7	(1)
1948–1955	Everton	73	(4)
1955–1956	Blackburn Rovers	6	(0)
1956–1957	Tranmere Rovers	9	(0)
1957–1960	Runcorn		

International career
1951–1954	Republic of Ireland	3	(0)
- * Club domestic league appearances and goals

Thomas Clinton (13 April 1926 – 9 August 2009) was a professional footballer.

== Career ==
Clinton began his career at Dundalk in his native Ireland before joining Everton in March 1948. He made 80 appearances for Everton (73 League and 7 FA Cup appearances) scoring 5 goals (4 League and 1 FA Cup).

After eight seasons at Goodison Park, Clinton was sold to Blackburn Rovers in April 1955, where he played only six games. He subsequently signed for Tranmere Rovers in July 1956, where he finished his professional career.

At international level, Clinton appeared three times for the Republic of Ireland between 1951 and 1954.
