= Jack Jones (footballer, born 1913) =

English footballer (1913–1995)

Personal information
- Full name: John Edward Jones
- Date of birth: 3 July 1913
- Place of birth: Bromborough, England
- Date of death: 26 January 1995 (aged 81)
- Height: 5 ft 9 1/2 in (1.77 m)
- Positions: Centre forward; full-back

Senior career*
| Years | Team | Apps | (Gls) |
| 1934–1938 | Everton | 98 | (0) |
| 1938–? | Sunderland | | |
- * Club domestic league appearances and goals

John Edward Jones (3 July 1913 – 26 January 1995) was an English professional footballer who played for Everton and Sunderland. Originally a centre-forward, he eventually became a full-back. He made his Everton debut in April 1934 in a 2–0 win against Leeds United. After making 108 appearances for Everton, he joined Sunderland in 1938.
