= Stan Bentham =

English footballer (1915–2002)

Personal information
- Full name: Stanley Joseph Bentham
- Date of birth: 17 March 1915
- Place of birth: Leigh, England
- Date of death: 29 May 2002 (aged 87)
- Height: 5 ft 8 1/2 in (1.74 m)
- Position: Wing half

Senior career*
Years	Team	Apps	(Gls)
1933–1935	Wigan Athletic	5	(3)
1935–1949	Everton	110	(17)
Total		115	(20)
- * Club domestic league appearances and goals

Stanley Joseph Bentham (17 March 1915 – 29 May 2002) was an English footballer.

Born at Leigh, Lancashire, in 1915, he had a trial with Football League club Bolton Wanderers as a teenager in the early 1930s but was not offered a professional contract and signed for non-league Wigan Athletic instead. He played five times for the club in the 1933-34 season as they won the Cheshire County League title, scoring three goals. He turned professional on 1 January 1935, still only aged 18, when First Division giants Everton signed him. He made his senior debut on 23 November 1935 in a league game against Grimsby Town at Blundell Park and was soon a regular first team player, missing just one league game in the 1938-39 season, but he was 23 years old when in September of that year World War II broke out and by the time league action resumed for the 1946-47 season, he was already 30 years old and had lost most of the prime years of his career.

He remained with Everton as a player before retiring at the end of the 1947-48 season, by which time he had played 125 competitive games for the Goodison Park club (110 of them in the league) and scored seven goals. He remained on the club's payroll as a coach until 1962, when he secured a similar position at Luton Town. This was his final job in football.

By the late 1990s, Bentham was suffering from Alzheimer's disease and was living in a nursing home at Southport by the time of his death in May 2002 at the age of 87.
