= Jackie Coulter =

Northern Irish footballer

Personal information
- Date of birth: 1 Dec 1910
- Place of birth: Whiteabbey, Ireland
- Date of death: 9 Jan 1981 (70)
- Place of death: Belfast, Northern Ireland
- Height: 5 ft 7 1/2 in (1.71 m)
- Position: Winger

Youth career
- Carrickfergus
- Brantwood
- Dunmurry

Senior career*
Years	Team	Apps	(Gls)
1929	Dundalk	0	(0)
1929–1934	Belfast Celtic		
1934–1937	Everton	50	(16)
1937–1938	Grimsby Town	25	(11)
1938	Chester	4	(0)
1938–1939	Chelmsford City		
1939	Swansea Town	3	(0)
1940	Linfield	3	
1940	Shelbourne	1	(0)

International career
1933–1938	Ireland	11	(1)
- * Club domestic league appearances and goals as of 20:40, 5 August 2017 (UTC)

Jackie Coulter (1 Dec 1910 in Whiteabbey – 9 Jan 1981 Belfast) was a Northern Irish former footballer.

== Career ==
He played for a number of intermediate clubs before signing for Belfast Celtic as a seventeen-year-old. At Celtic Park he developed into one of the finest players in the Irish League, usually starring at inside-left or on the left-wing. His finest performance in the hooped jersey was perhaps in the 1930 City Cup deciding play-off. Slotting in at centre-forward, Coulter scored a hat-trick to take the trophy back to Celtic Park. More honours came his way in the shape of the further City Cups, the Belfast Charities Cup and finally in 1933, the Irish League Championship.

Early in the 1933/34 season Coulter won his first IFA International cap in a 2–1 win over Scotland, maintaining his place for the remainder of that season's British Home Championship. He also featured in both of the Irish League's representative fixtures, including in a 3–0 victory over their Scottish counterparts. It was performances in matches such as these which drew the attentions of some of the leading clubs in England. His signing for Everton in the spring of 1934 did however surprise his Celtic teammates. Having been sent–off in a match at Ballymena, Coulter was approached by an Everton official, and terms were agreed on a £2,750 fee. When the Celtic players returned to the dressing room after the final whistle they were greeted by the news of his departure.

Coulter made his League debut in a 1–1 draw against Portsmouth in April 1934, and although his spell at Goodison Park coincided with a lull in fortunes after the successes of the early–thirties, he was a popular addition to the Everton squad. He will no doubt be best remembered by the Goodison faithful for his hat-trick in a 6–4 FA Cup fourth round replay defeat of Sunderland, a match regarded as one of the best in the ground's history.

He added further caps to his collection while with Everton too, scoring the winner in his first international match since his move to England against Scotland in October 1934. Four months later he starred in one of Ireland's best performances of the time, only to see his penalty - that would have put the Irish into a 2–1 lead - crash against the crossbar. Cliff Bastin later seized upon an under-hit pass by Irish captain Bertie Fulton to give England a 2–1 victory.

A move to Grimsby Town in September 1937, then in the middle of the most successful period in their history, lasted a little under a season. After that Coulter had a brief spells at Chester (in Football League Division Three North), Southern League Chelmsford City (where he won his final cap) and finally at Division Two side Swansea, before his career was cut short by the outbreak of the Second World War. The war brought a brief spell with Linfield, but having been out of the game for eighteen months he was without his former impact, and quit after three games. In December 1940 Coulter signed for Shelbourne but was injured after only one match against Brideville and did not feature again for the club.

== Other sports ==
As well as his distinguished footballing career, Jackie Coulter also excelled at roller skating, becoming an Irish Champion.
