= Charles Gee =

English footballer (1909–1981)

Personal information
- Full name: Charles William Gee
- Date of birth: 6 April 1909
- Place of birth: Stockport, England
- Date of death: 1981 (aged 71–72)
- Height: 5 ft 11 1/2 in (1.82 m)
- Position: Centre half

Senior career*
Years	Team	Apps	(Gls)
1931–1938	Everton	212	(2)

International career
1931–1936	England	3	(0)
- * Club domestic league appearances and goals

Charles William Gee (6 April 1909 – 1981) was an English international footballer, who played as a centre half.

== Career ==
Born in Stockport, Gee played professionally for Everton, and earned three caps for England between 1931 and 1936.
