= T. G. Jones =

Welsh footballer

Personal information
- Full name: Thomas George Jones
- Date of birth: 12 October 1917
- Place of birth: Queensferry, Wales
- Date of death: 3 January 2004 (aged 86)
- Height: 6 ft 0 in (1.83 m)
- Position: Defender

Senior career*
Years	Team	Apps	(Gls)
1934–1936	Wrexham	6	(0)
1936–1950	Everton	178	(5)
1950–1957	Pwllheli	?	(?)
1957–1959	Bangor	?	(?)

International career
1938–1950	Wales	17	(?)
1939–1945	Wales (wartime)	11	(?)

Managerial career
- 1950–1957: Pwllheli
- 1957–1967: Bangor City
- 1963: Toronto Italia
- 1968: Rhyl
- 1971–1972: Bethesda
- * Club domestic league appearances and goals

Thomas George Jones (12 October 1917 – 3 January 2004) was a Welsh footballer most notable for his career with Everton and Wales.

== Biography ==
Born in Queensferry and raised in Connah's Quay, Tommy (T.G.) Jones started his professional career with Wrexham. He signed for Everton for £3,000 in 1936. He won a Football League First Division champions medal in only his second full season at Everton in 1938–39, before his career was interrupted by the Second World War. Jones served as a sergeant PT Instructor in the RAF during the war, but he resumed his career for Everton in 1946. A.S. Roma successfully bid £15,000 for him, a large sum in those days, but foreign exchange regulations stopped the transfer. After the war Everton transferred Tommy Lawton to Chelsea and Joe Mercer to Arsenal. These deals were not only blows to the Everton team, but to him personally, he had been best man at Joe Mercer's wedding.

A club director falsely accused Jones of feigning injury in a wartime match and his senior appearances thereafter were sporadic. Jones's injury was actually severe enough to put him in hospital for four months. Once the relations with the manager Cliff Britton became so bad that he was even not picked for the reserve team, and played secretly for Hawarden Grammar Old Boys. Jones became club captain in 1949 but after falling out of favour, in January 1950, he accepted an offer to leave Everton for Pwllheli. In all he made 178 peacetime appearances for Everton, scoring five goals.

Jones won 17 caps for Wales and eleven caps in wartime internationals.

After Jones left Everton he played non-league football for Pwllheli and became their part-time manager, as well as running a hotel in the town. In 1957 he became manager of Bangor City. In 1962, after winning the Welsh Cup, the team beat Napoli 2–0 in the home leg in the European Cup Winners Cup but lost 1–3 in Italy. With no away-goal rule, Bangor lost the replay 3–1. In 1963, he was named the head coach for Toronto Italia in the Eastern Canada Professional Soccer League. He ended his managerial career at Rhyl followed by a brief stint as advisor to Bethesda. In later life Jones ran a newsagent's shop in north Wales.

He was elected a 'Millennium Giant' by Everton in 2000, one of the first eleven from the club's long history to be so honoured. The panel of assessors described him as an apparently effortless, skilful and assured footballer. He passed the ball from his position at centre-half in the same way that Franz Beckenbauer would do later. He was renowned for his sporting behaviour. Stanley Matthews, Tommy Lawton, Joe Mercer and Dixie Dean each cited Jones as the greatest player that they ever saw. Former Liverpool star of the same era, Cyril Done, said that "T. G. was a gentleman off the field, and a gentleman on the field".

In addition to his playing career, Tommy was instrumental in re-establishing senior football in his home town after the collapse of Connah's Quay and Shotton United in 1927, just six months after they had won the Welsh Cup and beating the previous season's FA Cup winners Cardiff City in the final. Though junior clubs, notable Connah's Quay Albion played in the town it was not until Tommy's intervention in July 1946 that Connah's Quay Juniors, the fore-runner of the present-day Nomads club was formed. Attracted by the reputation of the famous international, youngsters from Connah's Quay and its surrounding towns and villages flocked to join the new team which quickly became a major force in North Wales youth soccer, winning the Welsh Youth Cup in 1948. By natural progression a senior team was formed and joined the Flintshire League in 1948. Success soon followed and Connah's Quay Juniors reached the final of the Welsh Amateur Cup in 1950/51. Prior to the 1952/53 season, the suffix Nomads was adopted and the team ventured into the Welsh League (North).

== Personal life ==
His wife Joyce died in 2003. He was survived by his two daughters, Jane and Elizabeth.
