= Billy Cook (footballer, born 1909) =

Northern Irish footballer and manager

Personal information
- Full name: William Cook
- Date of birth: 20 November 1909
- Place of birth: Coleraine, Ireland
- Date of death: 11 December 1992 (aged 83)
- Place of death: Liverpool, England
- Height: 5 ft 7 1/2 in (1.71 m)
- Position: Defender

Senior career*
Years	Team	Apps	(Gls)
1928–1930	Port Glasgow Athletic Juniors		
1930–1932	Celtic	100	(0)
1932–1939	Everton	228	(5)
1945–1946	Wrexham		
1946	Ellesmere Port Town		
1946–1947	Rhyl		

International career
1932–1939	Ireland	15	(0)

Managerial career
- 1946–1947: Rhyl (player-manager)
- 1947: Brann
- 1948–1949: Sunderland (coach)
- 1949–1951: Brann
- 1953: Peru
- 1954–1955: Portadown
- 1955–1956: Iraq
- 1956: Wigan Athletic
- 1957–1958: Crewe Alexandra (coach)
- 1958: Norwich City (coach)
- * Club domestic league appearances and goals

William Cook (20 January 1909 – 11 December 1992) was a Northern Irish professional football player and manager. He was capped 15 times for Ireland.

== Career ==
Cook began his football career in Scotland with Junior side Port Glasgow Athletic Juniors. He signed for Celtic in February 1930, and made his debut within the week in a 4–0 win over Ayr United. He established himself in the side, and at the end of the following season won a Scottish Cup medal when Celtic defeated Motherwell in the final after a replay. Cook usually played at right-back, but could also play as a left-back when the need arose.

In December 1932, Cook was transferred to Everton for £3,000. It was a surprise move at the time and he is considered one of the first high-profile players to leave Celtic mid season for another club. Cook stated that the reasons for the move were financial. He enjoyed immediate success at Goodison Park, helping Everton win the 1933 FA Cup Final with a 3–0 win over Manchester City at Wembley. On his death in December 1992, almost 60 years later, he was the last surviving player from that team. A League championship win followed in 1939, but the outbreak of World War II prevented Everton from building further on this success. In his time at Everton, Cook made 250 appearances and scored six goals.

During the war years, Cook guested for several clubs throughout Britain. Following the end of the war, he had brief spells at Wrexham and Ellesmere Port Town before joining Rhyl as player-manager in October 1946.

Cook became coach at Norwegian club SK Brann in 1947, before returning to the UK to briefly coach Sunderland. The next few years saw Cook travelling extensively; rejoining SK Brann for a couple of years, moving to South America to coach the Peru national side, before returning home in 1954 as manager of Portadown. Then after a spell as Youth team manager of Northern Ireland he went abroad again, spending a year as manager of the Iraq national side. He returned to the UK again in 1956, with spells as manager at Wigan and as a coach at Crewe before becoming trainer-coach at Norwich in 1958.

== Honours ==
Everton

- FA Cup: 1932–33

Sporting positions
Preceded by Dixie Dean	Everton captain 1937-1938	Succeeded by Jock Thomson
