= 1991–92 Manchester City F.C. season =

English football club season

Manchester City
1991–92 season
- Chairman: Peter Swales
- Manager: Peter Reid (player-manager)
- Stadium: Maine Road
- First Division: 5th
- FA Cup: Third round
- League Cup: Fourth round
- Full Members' Cup: Second round
- Top goalscorer: League: White (19); All: White (22)
- Highest home attendance: 38,180 vs Manchester United; 16 November 1991
- Lowest home attendance: 10,987 vs Chester City; 25 September 1991
- Average home league attendance: 27,691 (7th highest in England)
| Home colours | Away colours |

The 1991–92 season was Manchester City's third consecutive season in the top tier of English football, the Football League First Division.

== Season summary ==
The 1991–92 season saw another solid campaign for Peter Reid's Manchester City side as they finished 5th in the top flight for a second season running.

== Final league table ==
| Pos | Team | Pld | W | D | L | GF | GA | GD | Pts | Qualification or relegation |
|---|---|---|---|---|---|---|---|---|---|---|
| 3 | Sheffield Wednesday | 42 | 21 | 12 | 9 | 62 | 49 | +13 | 75 | Qualification for the UEFA Cup first round and qualification for the FA Premier League (Note: Manchester United also won the League Cup – that UEFA Cup qualifying place was passed down to the third-placed League team.) |
| 4 | Arsenal | 42 | 19 | 15 | 8 | 81 | 46 | +35 | 72 | Qualification for the FA Premier League |
| 5 | Manchester City | 42 | 20 | 10 | 12 | 61 | 48 | +13 | 70 | Qualification for the FA Premier League |
| 6 | Liverpool | 42 | 16 | 16 | 10 | 47 | 40 | +7 | 64 | Qualification for the European Cup Winners' Cup first round and qualification for the FA Premier League |
| 7 | Aston Villa | 42 | 17 | 9 | 16 | 48 | 44 | +4 | 60 | Qualification for the FA Premier League |

Source: World Football
Rules for classification: 1) Points; 2) Goal difference; 3) Goals scored

=== Results summary ===
| Overall | | | | | | | | Home | | | | | | Away | | | | | |
| Pld | W | D | L | GF | GA | GD | Pts | W | D | L | GF | GA | GD | W | D | L | GF | GA | GD |
|---|---|---|---|---|---|---|---|---|---|---|---|---|---|---|---|---|---|---|---|
| 42 | 20 | 10 | 12 | 61 | 48 | +13 | 70 | 13 | 4 | 4 | 32 | 14 | +18 | 7 | 6 | 8 | 29 | 34 | −5 |

== Results ==
Manchester City's score comes first

=== Legend ===
| Win | Draw | Loss |

=== Football League First Division ===
| Date | Opponent | Venue | Result | Attendance | Scorers |
|---|---|---|---|---|---|
| 17 August 1991 | Coventry City | A | 1–0 | 18,013 | Quinn |
| 21 August 1991 | Liverpool | H | 2–1 | 37,322 | White (2) |
| 24 August 1991 | Crystal Palace | H | 3–2 | 28,028 | Brennan (2), White |
| 28 August 1991 | Norwich City | A | 0–0 | 15,376 | |
| 31 August 1991 | Arsenal | A | 1–2 | 35,009 | I Brightwell |
| 4 September 1991 | Nottingham Forest | H | 2–1 | 29,146 | Hill, Quinn |
| 7 September 1991 | Leeds United | A | 0–3 | 29,986 | |
| 14 September 1991 | Sheffield Wednesday | H | 0–1 | 29,453 | |
| 17 September 1991 | Everton | H | 0–1 | 27,509 | |
| 21 September 1991 | West Ham United | A | 2–1 | 25,558 | Hendry, Redmond |
| 28 September 1991 | Oldham Athletic | H | 1–2 | 31,271 | White |
| 6 October 1991 | Notts County | A | 3–1 | 11,878 | Allen (2), Sheron |
| 19 October 1991 | Tottenham Hotspur | A | 1–0 | 30,502 | Quinn |
| 26 October 1991 | Sheffield United | H | 3–2 | 25,495 | Hughes, Quinn, Sheron |
| 2 November 1991 | Southampton | A | 3–0 | 13,933 | Quinn, Sheron, Gittens (own goal) |
| 16 November 1991 | Manchester United | H | 0–0 | 38,180 | |
| 23 November 1991 | Luton Town | A | 2–2 | 10,031 | Curle, White |
| 30 November 1991 | Wimbledon | H | 0–0 | 22,429 | |
| 7 December 1991 | Aston Villa | A | 1–3 | 26,265 | White |
| 14 December 1991 | Queens Park Rangers | H | 2–2 | 21,437 | Curle, White |
| 21 December 1991 | Liverpool | A | 2–2 | 36,743 | White (2) |
| 26 December 1991 | Norwich City | H | 2–1 | 28,164 | Quinn, White |
| 28 December 1991 | Arsenal | H | 1–0 | 32,325 | White |
| 1 January 1992 | Chelsea | A | 1–1 | 18,196 | Sheron |
| 11 January 1992 | Crystal Palace | A | 1–1 | 14,766 | Curle |
| 18 January 1992 | Coventry City | H | 1–0 | 23,005 | White |
| 1 February 1992 | Tottenham Hotspur | H | 1–0 | 30,123 | White |
| 8 February 1992 | Sheffield United | A | 2–4 | 25,839 | Curle, Hill |
| 15 February 1992 | Luton Town | H | 4–0 | 22,137 | White (2), Heath, Hill |
| 22 February 1992 | Wimbledon | A | 1–2 | 5,082 | Sheron |
| 29 February 1992 | Aston Villa | H | 2–0 | 28,268 | Quinn, White |
| 7 March 1992 | Queens Park Rangers | A | 0–4 | 10,791 | |
| 15 March 1992 | Southampton | H | 0–1 | 24,265 | |
| 21 March 1992 | Nottingham Forest | A | 0–2 | 24,115 | |
| 28 March 1992 | Chelsea | H | 0–0 | 23,633 | |
| 4 April 1992 | Leeds United | H | 4–0 | 30,239 | Brennan, Hill, Quinn, Sheron |
| 7 April 1992 | Manchester United | A | 1–1 | 46,781 | Curle |
| 11 April 1992 | Sheffield Wednesday | A | 0–2 | 32,138 | |
| 18 April 1992 | West Ham United | H | 2–0 | 25,601 | Clarke, Pointon |
| 20 April 1992 | Everton | A | 2–1 | 21,101 | Quinn (2) |
| 25 April 1992 | Notts County | H | 2–0 | 23,426 | Quinn, Simpson |
| 2 May 1992 | Oldham Athletic | A | 5–2 | 18,588 | White (3), Mike, Sheron |

=== FA Cup ===
| Round | Date | Opponent | Venue | Result | Attendance | Goalscorers |
|---|---|---|---|---|---|---|
| R3 | 4 January 1992 | Middlesbrough | A | 1–2 | 21,174 | Reid 25' |

=== League Cup ===
| Round | Date | Opponent | Venue | Result | Attendance | Goalscorers |
|---|---|---|---|---|---|---|
| R2 1st leg | 25 September 1991 | Chester City | H | 3–1 | 10,987 | White (2), Quinn |
| R2 2nd leg | 8 October 1991 | Chester City | A | 3–0 (won 6–1 on agg) | 4,146 | Allen, Brennan, Sheron |
| R3 | 29 October 1991 | Queens Park Rangers | H | 0–0 | 15,512 | |
| R3R | 20 November 1991 | Queens Park Rangers | A | 3–1 | 11,033 | Heath (2), Quinn |
| R4 | 3 December 1991 | Middlesbrough | A | 1–2 | 17,286 | White |

=== Full Members' Cup ===
| Round | Date | Opponent | Venue | Result | Attendance | Goalscorers |
|---|---|---|---|---|---|---|
| R2 | 23 October 1991 | Sheffield Wednesday | A | 2–3 | 7,951 | Hendry (2) |

== Squad ==
Note: Flags indicate national team as defined under FIFA eligibility rules; some limited exceptions apply. Players may hold more than one non-FIFA nationality.

| Pos. | Nation | Player |
|---|---|---|
| GK | ENG | Tony Coton |
| GK | WAL | Andy Dibble |
| GK | WAL | Martyn Margetson |
| DF | ENG | David Brightwell |
| DF | ENG | Ian Brightwell |
| DF | ENG | Keith Curle |
| DF | SCO | Colin Hendry |
| DF | ENG | Andy Hill |
| DF | NED | Danny Hoekman |
| DF | ENG | Steve Macauley |
| DF | WAL | Mark Peters |
| DF | ENG | Neil Pointon |
| DF | ENG | Steve Redmond |
| DF | NED | Michel Vonk |
| MF | ENG | Mark Brennan |
| MF | ENG | Garry Flitcroft |
| MF | NIR | Michael Hughes |

| Pos. | Nation | Player |
|---|---|---|
| MF | SCO | David Kerr |
| MF | ENG | Paul Lake |
| MF | NIR | Steve Lomas |
| MF | TRI | Ronnie Mauge |
| MF | ENG | Steve McMahon |
| MF | ENG | Gary Megson |
| MF | ENG | Mike Quigley |
| MF | ENG | Peter Reid (player-manager) |
| MF | JAM | Fitzroy Simpson |
| MF | ENG | David White |
| FW | ENG | Clive Allen |
| FW | ENG | Jason Beckford |
| FW | ENG | Wayne Clarke |
| FW | ENG | Adrian Heath |
| FW | ENG | Adie Mike |
| FW | IRL | Niall Quinn |
| FW | ENG | Mike Sheron |

== Transfers ==
=== In ===
| Date | Pos | Name | From | Fee |
|---|---|---|---|---|
| 14 August 1991 | DF | Keith Curle | Wimbledon | £2,500,000 |
| 24 December 1991 | MF | Steve McMahon | Liverpool | £900,000 |
| 6 March 1992 | MF | Fitzroy Simpson | Swindon Town | £500,000 |
| 11 March 1992 | DF | Michel Vonk | SVV Dordrecht | £500,000 |

=== Out ===
| Date | Pos | Name | To | Fee |
|---|---|---|---|---|
| 30 July 1991 | FW | Ashley Ward | Leicester City | £80,000 |
| 12 August 1991 | DF | Alan Harper | Everton | £200,000 |
| 12 August 1991 | MF | Mark Ward | Everton | £1,100,000 |
| 8 November 1991 | DF | Colin Hendry | Blackburn Rovers | £700,000 |
| 6 December 1991 | FW | Clive Allen | Chelsea | £250,000 |
| 1 January 1992 | DF | Steve Macauley | Fleetwood Town | Free transfer |
| 2 January 1992 | FW | Jason Beckford | Birmingham City | £50,000 |
| 27 March 1992 | FW | Adrian Heath | Stoke City | £50,000 |

Transfers in: ▼£4,400,000
Transfers out: ▲£2,430,000
Total spending: ▼£1,970,000
