= 1992–93 Manchester City F.C. season =

English football club season

Manchester City
1992–93 season
- Chairman: Peter Swales
- Manager: Peter Reid (player-manager)
- Stadium: Maine Road
- Premier League: 9th
- FA Cup: Sixth round
- League Cup: Third round
- Top goalscorer: League: White (16); All: White (19)
- Highest home attendance: 37,136 vs Manchester United; 27 March 1993
- Lowest home attendance: 9,967 vs Bristol Rovers; 23 September 1992
- Average home league attendance: 24,698 (7th highest in league)
Home colours	Away colours	Third colours

The 1992–93 season was Manchester City's fourth consecutive season in the top tier of English football, and their first season in the inaugural year of the breakaway Premier League.

== Season summary ==
In the 1992–93 season, Manchester City had a satisfying campaign, reaching the quarter-finals of the FA Cup eventually losing 4–2 to Tottenham Hotspur. In the Premier League, they were in a great position by 21 November, just three points adrift from the possible UEFA Cup place and seemed to be their realistic target but during most of the second half of the season, particularly in the final weeks of the campaign, Manchester City went on a poor run of just 2 wins of their final 11 league games and ended up finishing in a disappointing 9th place.

== Kit ==
City retained the previous season's kit, manufactured by English company Umbro and sponsored by Japanese electronics manufacturer Brother.

== Final league table ==
Pos	Team	Pld	W	D	L	GF	GA	GD	Pts	Qualification or relegation
7	Sheffield Wednesday	42	15	14	13	55	51	+4	59	
8	Tottenham Hotspur	42	16	11	15	60	66	−6	59	
9	Manchester City	42	15	12	15	56	51	+5	57	
10	Arsenal	42	15	11	16	40	38	+2	56	Qualification for the Cup Winners' Cup first round (Note: Arsenal qualified by winning the FA Cup and therefore did not take up their UEFA Cup spot for winning the League Cup, which reverted to the league.)
11	Chelsea	42	14	14	14	51	54	−3	56	

Source: Premier League
Rules for classification: 1) points; 2) goal difference; 3) number of goals scored.

=== Results summary ===
Overall								Home						Away					
Pld	W	D	L	GF	GA	GD	Pts	W	D	L	GF	GA	GD	W	D	L	GF	GA	GD
42	15	12	15	56	51	+5	57	7	8	6	30	25	+5	8	4	9	26	26	0

== Results ==
Manchester City's score comes first

=== Legend ===
Win	Draw	Loss

=== FA Premier League ===
Date	Opponent	Venue	Result	Attendance	Scorers
17 August 1992	Queens Park Rangers	H	1–1	24,471	White
19 August 1992	Middlesbrough	A	0–2	15,369	
22 August 1992	Blackburn Rovers	A	0–1	19,433	
26 August 1992	Norwich City	H	3–1	23,182	White (2), McMahon
29 August 1992	Oldham Athletic	H	3–3	27,255	Quinn, Vonk, White
1 September 1992	Wimbledon	A	1–0	4,714	White
5 September 1992	Sheffield Wednesday	A	3–0	27,169	White (2), Vonk
12 September 1992	Middlesbrough	H	0–1	25,244	
20 September 1992	Chelsea	H	0–1	22,420	
28 September 1992	Arsenal	A	0–1	21,504	
3 October 1992	Nottingham Forest	H	2–2	22,571	Holden, Simpson
17 October 1992	Crystal Palace	A	0–0	14,005	
24 October 1992	Southampton	H	1–0	20,089	Sheron
31 October 1992	Everton	A	3–1	20,242	Sheron (2), White
7 November 1992	Leeds United	H	4–0	27,255	Sheron, White, Hill, I Brightwell
21 November 1992	Coventry City	A	3–2	14,590	Sheron, Quinn, Curle (pen)
28 November 1992	Tottenham Hotspur	H	0–1	25,496	
6 December 1992	Manchester United	A	1–2	35,408	Quinn
12 December 1992	Ipswich Town	A	1–3	16,833	Flitcroft
19 December 1992	Aston Villa	H	1–1	23,525	Flitcroft
26 December 1992	Sheffield United	H	2–0	27,455	White (2)
28 December 1992	Liverpool	A	1–1	43,037	Quinn
9 January 1993	Chelsea	A	4–2	15,939	White, Sheron (2), Sinclair (own goal)
16 January 1993	Arsenal	H	0–1	25,041	
26 January 1993	Oldham Athletic	A	1–0	14,903	Quinn
30 January 1993	Blackburn Rovers	H	3–2	29,122	Sheron, Curle (pen), White
6 February 1993	Queens Park Rangers	A	1–1	13,003	Sheron
20 February 1993	Norwich City	A	1–2	16,386	Sheron
23 February 1993	Sheffield Wednesday	H	1–2	23,619	Quinn
27 February 1993	Nottingham Forest	A	2–0	25,956	White, Flitcroft
10 March 1993	Coventry City	H	1–0	20,092	Flitcroft
13 March 1993	Leeds United	A	0–1	30,840	
20 March 1993	Manchester United	H	1–1	37,136	Quinn
24 March 1993	Tottenham Hotspur	A	1–3	27,247	Sheron
3 April 1993	Ipswich Town	H	3–1	20,680	Quinn, Holden, Vonk
9 April 1993	Sheffield United	A	1–1	18,231	Pemberton (own goal)
12 April 1993	Liverpool	H	1–1	28,098	Flitcroft
18 April 1993	Aston Villa	A	1–3	33,108	Quinn
21 April 1993	Wimbledon	H	1–1	19,524	Holden
1 May 1993	Southampton	A	1–0	11,830	White
5 May 1993	Crystal Palace	H	0–0	21,167	
8 May 1993	Everton	H	2–5	25,180	White, Curle (pen)

=== FA Cup ===
Round	Date	Opponent	Venue	Result	Attendance	Goalscorers
R3	2 January 1993	Reading	H	1–1	20,523	Sheron
R3R	13 January 1993	Reading	A	4–0	12,065	Sheron, Holden, Flitcroft, Quinn
R4	23 January 1993	Queens Park Rangers	A	2–1	18,652	White, Vonk
R5	13 February 1993	Barnsley	H	2–0	32,807	White (2)
QF	7 March 1993	Tottenham Hotspur	H	2–4	23,050	Sheron, Phelan

=== League Cup ===
Round	Date	Opponent	Venue	Result	Attendance	Goalscorers
R2 First Leg	23 September 1992	Bristol Rovers	H	0–0	9,967	
R2 Second Leg	7 October 1992	Bristol Rovers	A	2–1 (won 2–1 on agg)	7,823	Maddison (own goal), Holden
R3	28 October 1992	Tottenham Hotspur	H	0–1	18,399	

== First-team squad ==
Note: Flags indicate national team as defined under FIFA eligibility rules; some limited exceptions apply. Players may hold more than one non-FIFA nationality.

Pos.	Nation	Player
GK	ENG	Tony Coton
GK	WAL	Martyn Margetson
GK	WAL	Andy Dibble
DF	ENG	Keith Curle
DF	ENG	Andy Hill
DF	ENG	Ray Ranson
DF	ENG	David Brightwell
DF	ENG	Ian Brightwell
DF	ENG	John Foster
DF	IRL	Terry Phelan
DF	NED	Michel Vonk
MF	ENG	Steve McMahon

Pos.	Nation	Player
MF	ENG	Paul Lake
MF	ENG	Garry Flitcroft
MF	ENG	Mike Quigley
MF	ENG	Rick Holden
MF	ENG	David White
MF	ENG	Peter Reid (player-manager)
MF	ENG	Fitzroy Simpson
MF	SCO	David Kerr
MF	NOR	Kåre Ingebrigtsen
FW	ENG	Mike Sheron
FW	ENG	Adie Mike
FW	IRL	Niall Quinn

== Reserve squad ==
Note: Flags indicate national team as defined under FIFA eligibility rules; some limited exceptions apply. Players may hold more than one non-FIFA nationality.

Pos.	Nation	Player
DF	ENG	Chris Beech
DF	ENG	Richard Edghill

Pos.	Nation	Player
MF	NIR	Steve Lomas
FW	ENG	Steve Finney
