= 1992–93 FA Premier League =

Football Season In England

FA Premier League
- Season: 1992–93
- Dates: 15 August 1992 – 11 May 1993
- Champions: Manchester United; 1st Premier League title 8th English title
- Relegated: Crystal Palace; Middlesbrough; Nottingham Forest
- Champions League: Manchester United
- Cup Winners' Cup: Arsenal
- UEFA Cup: Aston Villa; Norwich City
- Matches: 462
- Goals: 1,222 (2.65 per match)
- Top goalscorer: Teddy Sheringham (22 goals)
- Best goalkeeper: Bobby Mimms (19 clean sheets)
- Biggest home win: Blackburn Rovers 7–1 Norwich City (3 October 1992); Sheffield United 6–0 Tottenham Hotspur (2 March 1993)
- Biggest away win: Manchester United 0–3 Everton (19 August 1992); Sheffield Wednesday 0–3 Manchester City (5 September 1992); Leeds United 1–4 Nottingham Forest (5 December 1992); Blackburn Rovers 2–5 Coventry City (26 January 1993); Nottingham Forest 0–3 Norwich City (17 March 1993); Queens Park Rangers 0–3 Blackburn Rovers (24 March 1993); Manchester City 2–5 Everton (8 May 1993)
- Highest scoring: Oldham Athletic 5–3 Nottingham Forest (22 August 1992); Blackburn Rovers 7–1 Norwich City (3 October 1992); Oldham Athletic 6–2 Wimbledon (3 April 1993); Everton 3–5 Queens Park Rangers (12 April 1993); Liverpool 6–2 Tottenham Hotspur (8 May 1993)
- Longest winning run: 7 games Manchester United; Sheffield Wednesday
- Longest unbeaten run: 11 games Manchester United
- Longest winless run: 13 games Ipswich Town
- Longest losing run: 6 games Nottingham Forest
- Highest attendance: 44,619; Liverpool 1–0 Everton (20 March 1993)
- Lowest attendance: 3,039 (Note: Due to Wimbledon lacking a home stadium, they played their home games at Selhurst Park, which is the home stadium of Crystal Palace.); Wimbledon 1–3 Everton (26 January 1993)

The 1992–93 FA Premier League was the inaugural season of the Premier League, the top division of English football. The season began on 15 August 1992 and ended on 11 May 1993. The league was made up of the 22 clubs that broke away from the Football League at the end of the 1991–92 season. The new league was backed up by a five-year, £304 million deal with Sky to televise Premier League matches. In concept, the Premier League was identical to the old First Division of the Football League, which was now reduced to three divisions.

== Overview ==
=== Background ===
In May 1992, the breakaway league signed a broadcasting rights contract with Sky and the BBC valued at £304 million, the largest such agreement in the history of British sport. The league's executive committee was unable, however, to secure title sponsorship for the new competition after eight clubs blocked a proposed £13 million deal with brewers Bass. Nonetheless, clubs began to utilise their dramatically increased wealth to fund a series of high-profile transfers.

Although the idea of a super league had been mentioned by football's governing bodies and evaluated by the media since the mid-1980s, plans for a new Premier League of 22 clubs were first unveiled by the Football Association in October 1990, and included in the Football Association's Blueprint for the Future of Football, published in June 1991. The majority of First Division clubs, particularly long-established top clubs including Arsenal and Manchester United, were in favour of a breakaway from the Football League, although Football League president Bill Fox criticised the planned Premier League as an attempt by the Football Association to "hijack" the First Division.

Shortly before the season began, newly promoted Blackburn Rovers signed Southampton's 21-year-old England international striker Alan Shearer for a new British record fee variously reported as £3.3 million, £3.4 million, or £3.6 million. Several other players moved for fees of £2 million or more, including Arsenal's David Rocastle, who joined Leeds United, Dean Saunders, who moved from Liverpool to Aston Villa, and Teddy Sheringham, who left Nottingham Forest for Tottenham Hotspur.

The structure of the new league was identical to that of the previous season's Football League First Division, comprising 22 teams, with each playing the other 21 twice for a total of 42 matches. Ipswich Town and Middlesbrough had been promoted from the old Second Division as champions and runners-up respectively, and Blackburn Rovers took the third promotion place after winning the 1991–92 Second Division play-off.

=== Season summary ===
The first Premier League title went to Manchester United, the club's first title in 26 years. Their title was achieved with a 10-point lead over runners-up Aston Villa, after overcoming a slow start to the season which had seen them slip to mid table, with the signing of French striker Eric Cantona in late November proving to be the catalyst for their improved form which saw them lose just two league games after his arrival. Aston Villa were in close contention for the title right up to the end, topping the table at several points in the season, but fell short at the end, losing all of their last three games.

Norwich City led the table for most of the first half of the season, but their challenge faded in the final weeks of the campaign, and were out of contention with three games remaining, after they lost 3–1 to Ipswich Town. Norwich did however finish in third place, achieving European qualification in Mike Walker's debut season as manager; with a goal difference of −4, this is the highest Premier League finish by a team with a negative goal difference. Blackburn, in the top division for the first time in almost 30 years, finished in fourth place. They briefly led the league early in the season, but suffered a shortage of goals after Alan Shearer, who had scored 16 times before the turn of the year, suffered a torn cruciate ligament and missed the second half of the season. A strong end of season finish nearly knocked Norwich City off third, but it was ultimately not enough. The title race was largely between the clubs who finished in the top four after early challenges from the likes of Arsenal, Coventry City, and Queens Park Rangers were not sustained.

Nottingham Forest's league form had suffered through the sale of key players including Des Walker and Teddy Sheringham, and they were bottom of the Premier League for the majority of the season. Their relegation was confirmed in early May when they lost to Sheffield United, and manager Brian Clough announced his retirement after 18 years as manager, which had yielded one league title, two European Cups and four League Cups. Next to go were newly promoted Middlesbrough, who fell from mid-table at Christmas to go down in second from bottom place. Last to go down were Crystal Palace, who failed to win their final game of the season which would have instead consigned Oldham Athletic to the final relegation place. Oldham had been bottom of the table for all of February and in the relegation zone for nearly all of the latter half of the season, but secured their survival with a thrilling 4–3 win over Southampton.

Title holders Leeds United finished 17th, which was the lowest finish from a defending league champion since Ipswich Town finished 17th in 1962–63 after having won the title in 1961–62, and the lowest any top tier champions have so far finished in the Premier League. Leeds failed to win an away game in the league. The lowest a defending champion has finished since then has been 12th (Leicester City in 2016–17, having won the title in 2015–16). Liverpool, who had been the English league’s dominant force of the previous two decades with an honours list including 11 league titles between 1973 and 1990, finished a disappointing sixth, and had been in the bottom half of the table as late as March.

In total 1,222 goals were scored, which until the 2023–24 Premier League, stood as a Premier League record, mainly due to significantly fewer number of games from 1995–96 season onward. The top scorer in the new Premier League was Teddy Sheringham, who found the net for Nottingham Forest in their opening game of the season before being sold to Tottenham Hotspur, scoring a further 21 goals for the North London side in the league. PFA Player of the Year was Paul McGrath of Aston Villa. FWA Player of the Year was Chris Waddle, who helped Sheffield Wednesday achieve runners-up spot in both of the cups after ending his three-year spell in France. PFA Young Player of the Year was Ryan Giggs, who won the award for the second year running, and also picked up a league title medal with Manchester United.

On 26 January, Wimbledon hosted Everton at Selhurst Park in front of a crowd of just over 3,000. More than 30 years on, this remains the lowest attendance recorded at a Premier League match. Despite their frequently low attendances, Wimbledon managed to climb clear of the relegation battle during the second half of the season to finish 12th.

== Teams ==
Twenty-two teams competed in the league – the top nineteen teams from the First Division and the three teams promoted from the Second Division. The promoted teams were Ipswich Town, Middlesbrough and Blackburn Rovers, returning to the top flight after an absence of six, three and twenty-six years respectively. They replaced Luton Town, Notts County and West Ham United, who were relegated to the First Division, ending Luton Town's ten-year spell in the top flight, whilst both Notts County and West Ham United were relegated after only one year in the top flight.

=== Stadiums and locations ===
Locations of the 1992–93 Premier League teams
Greater London Premier League football clubs
Greater Manchester Premier League football clubs

Team	Location	Stadium	Capacity
Arsenal	London (Highbury)	Highbury	38,419
Aston Villa	Birmingham	Villa Park	39,399
Blackburn Rovers	Blackburn	Ewood Park	31,367
Chelsea	London (Fulham)	Stamford Bridge	36,000
Coventry City	Coventry	Highfield Road	23,489
Crystal Palace	London (Selhurst)	Selhurst Park	26,309
Everton	Liverpool (Walton)	Goodison Park	40,157
Ipswich Town	Ipswich	Portman Road	30,300
Leeds United	Leeds	Elland Road	40,204
Liverpool	Liverpool (Anfield)	Anfield	42,730
Manchester City	Manchester (Moss Side)	Maine Road	35,150
Manchester United	Manchester (Old Trafford)	Old Trafford	55,314
Middlesbrough	Middlesbrough	Ayresome Park	26,667
Norwich City	Norwich	Carrow Road	27,010
Nottingham Forest	West Bridgford	City Ground	30,539
Oldham Athletic	Manchester (Oldham)	Boundary Park	13,512
Queens Park Rangers	London (Shepherd's Bush)	Loftus Road	18,439
Sheffield United	Sheffield (Highfield)	Bramall Lane	32,702
Sheffield Wednesday	Sheffield (Owlerton)	Hillsborough Stadium	39,859
Southampton	Southampton	The Dell	15,200
Tottenham Hotspur	London (Tottenham)	White Hart Lane	36,230
Wimbledon	London (Selhurst)	Selhurst Park	26,309

=== Personnel and kits ===
(as of 9 May 1993)

Team	Manager	Captain	Kit manufacturer	Shirt sponsor
Arsenal	(Scotland) George Graham	(England) Tony Adams	Adidas	JVC
Aston Villa	(England) Ron Atkinson	(England) Kevin Richardson	Umbro	Mita Copiers
Blackburn Rovers	(Scotland) Kenny Dalglish	(England) Tim Sherwood	Asics	McEwan's Lager
Chelsea	(England) David Webb (caretaker)	(Republic of Ireland) Andy Townsend	Umbro	Commodore International
Coventry City	(England) Bobby Gould	(England) Brian Borrows	Ribero	Peugeot
Crystal Palace	(England) Steve Coppell	(England) Geoff Thomas	Bukta (until December); Ribero (from December)	Tulip Computers
Everton	(England) Howard Kendall	(England) Dave Watson	Umbro	NEC
Ipswich Town	(England) John Lyall	(England) David Linighan	Umbro	Fisons
Leeds United	(England) Howard Wilkinson	(Scotland) Gordon Strachan	Admiral	Admiral
Liverpool	(Scotland) Graeme Souness	(England) Mark Wright	Adidas	Carlsberg
Manchester City	(England) Peter Reid	(Republic of Ireland) Terry Phelan	Umbro	Brother Industries
Manchester United	(Scotland) Alex Ferguson	(England) Bryan Robson	Umbro	Sharp
Middlesbrough	(England) Lennie Lawrence	(Republic of Ireland) Alan Kernaghan	Admiral	Imperial Chemical Industries
Norwich City	(Wales) Mike Walker	(England) Ian Butterworth	Ribero	Norwich and Peterborough
Nottingham Forest	(England) Brian Clough	(England) Stuart Pearce	Umbro	Shipstones (home), Labatt's (away)
Oldham Athletic	(England) Joe Royle	(Republic of Ireland) Mike Milligan	Umbro	JD Sports
Queens Park Rangers	(England) Gerry Francis	(Northern Ireland) Alan McDonald	Clubhouse	Classic FM
Sheffield United	(England) Dave Bassett	(England) Brian Gayle	Umbro	Laver
Sheffield Wednesday	(England) Trevor Francis	(England) Nigel Pearson	Umbro	Sanderson
Southampton	(England) Ian Branfoot	(England) Glenn Cockerill	Admiral	Draper Tools
Tottenham Hotspur	(England) Doug Livermore (England) Ray Clemence	(England) Gary Mabbutt	Umbro	Holsten
Wimbledon	(Republic of Ireland) Joe Kinnear	(England) John Scales	Admiral	

=== Managerial changes ===
Team	Outgoing manager	Manner of departure	Date of vacancy	Position in table	Incoming manager	Date of appointment
Norwich City	(Wales) David Williams	End of caretaker spell	1 May 1992	Pre-season	(Wales) Mike Walker	1 June 1992
Coventry City	(England) Don Howe	End of caretaker spell	14 May 1992	Pre-season	(England) Bobby Gould	6 June 1992
Tottenham Hotspur	(England) Peter Shreeves	Sacked	19 May 1992	Pre-season	(England) Doug Livermore (England) Ray Clemence	19 May 1992
Chelsea	(Scotland) Ian Porterfield	Sacked	15 February 1993	12th	(England) David Webb	15 February 1993

== League table ==
Pos	Team	Pld	W	D	L	GF	GA	GD	Pts	Qualification or relegation
1	Manchester United (C)	42	24	12	6	67	31	+36	84	Qualification for the Champions League first round
2	Aston Villa	42	21	11	10	57	40	+17	74	Qualification for the UEFA Cup first round (Note: Since League Cup winners Arsenal had qualified for the UEFA Cup Winners Cup by also winning the FA Cup, the UEFA Cup berth for the League Cup reverted to the league and was awarded to Norwich City. England was considered for an extra slot for the UEFA Cup after the 1993 Polish football scandal, but another one was given to Scotland, and it was thought excessive to give both two slots to Great Britain, and the extra place was awarded to Hungary.)
3	Norwich City	42	21	9	12	61	65	−4	72	Qualification for the UEFA Cup first round
4	Blackburn Rovers	42	20	11	11	68	46	+22	71	
5	Queens Park Rangers	42	17	12	13	63	55	+8	63	
6	Liverpool	42	16	11	15	62	55	+7	59	
7	Sheffield Wednesday	42	15	14	13	55	51	+4	59	
8	Tottenham Hotspur	42	16	11	15	60	66	−6	59	
9	Manchester City	42	15	12	15	56	51	+5	57	
10	Arsenal	42	15	11	16	40	38	+2	56	Qualification for the Cup Winners' Cup first round (Note: Arsenal qualified by winning the FA Cup and therefore did not take up their UEFA Cup spot for winning the League Cup, which reverted to the league.)
11	Chelsea	42	14	14	14	51	54	−3	56	
12	Wimbledon	42	14	12	16	56	55	+1	54	
13	Everton	42	15	8	19	53	55	−2	53	
14	Sheffield United	42	14	10	18	54	53	+1	52	
15	Coventry City	42	13	13	16	52	57	−5	52	
16	Ipswich Town	42	12	16	14	50	55	−5	52	
17	Leeds United	42	12	15	15	57	62	−5	51	
18	Southampton	42	13	11	18	54	61	−7	50	
19	Oldham Athletic	42	13	10	19	63	74	−11	49	
20	Crystal Palace (R)	42	11	16	15	48	61	−13	49	Relegation to Football League First Division
21	Middlesbrough (R)	42	11	11	20	54	75	−21	44	Relegation to Football League First Division
22	Nottingham Forest (R)	42	10	10	22	41	62	−21	40	Relegation to Football League First Division

Source: Premier League
Rules for classification: 1) points; 2) goal difference; 3) number of goals scored.
(C) Champions; (R) Relegated

== Results ==
Home \ Away	ARS	AVL	BLB	CHE	COV	CRY	EVE	IPS	LEE	LIV	MCI	MUN	MID	NOR	NFO	OLD	QPR	SHU	SHW	SOU	TOT	WIM
Arsenal	—	0–1	0–1	2–1	3–0	3–0	2–0	0–0	0–0	0–1	1–0	0–1	1–1	2–4	1–1	2–0	0–0	1–1	2–1	4–3	1–3	0–1
Aston Villa	1–0	—	0–0	1–3	0–0	3–0	2–1	2–0	1–1	4–2	3–1	1–0	5–1	2–3	2–1	0–1	2–0	3–1	2–0	1–1	0–0	1–0
Blackburn Rovers	1–0	3–0	—	2–0	2–5	1–2	2–3	2–1	3–1	4–1	1–0	0–0	1–1	7–1	4–1	2–0	1–0	1–0	1–0	0–0	0–2	0–0
Chelsea	1–0	0–1	0–0	—	2–1	3–1	2–1	2–1	1–0	0–0	2–4	1–1	4–0	2–3	0–0	1–1	1–0	1–2	0–2	1–1	1–1	4–2
Coventry City	0–2	3–0	0–2	1–2	—	2–2	0–1	2–2	3–3	5–1	2–3	0–1	2–1	1–1	0–1	3–0	0–1	1–3	1–0	2–0	1–0	0–2
Crystal Palace	1–2	1–0	3–3	1–1	0–0	—	0–2	3–1	1–0	1–1	0–0	0–2	4–1	1–2	1–1	2–2	1–1	2–0	1–1	1–2	1–3	2–0
Everton	0–0	1–0	2–1	0–1	1–1	0–2	—	3–0	2–0	2–1	1–3	0–2	2–2	0–1	3–0	2–2	3–5	0–2	1–1	2–1	1–2	0–0
Ipswich Town	1–2	1–1	2–1	1–1	0–0	2–2	1–0	—	4–2	2–2	3–1	2–1	0–1	3–1	2–1	1–2	1–1	0–0	0–1	0–0	1–1	2–1
Leeds United	3–0	1–1	5–2	1–1	2–2	0–0	2–0	1–0	—	2–2	1–0	0–0	3–0	0–0	1–4	2–0	1–1	3–1	3–1	2–1	5–0	2–1
Liverpool	0–2	1–2	2–1	2–1	4–0	5–0	1–0	0–0	2–0	—	1–1	1–2	4–1	4–1	0–0	1–0	1–0	2–1	1–0	1–1	6–2	2–3
Manchester City	0–1	1–1	3–2	0–1	1–0	0–0	2–5	3–1	4–0	1–1	—	1–1	0–1	3–1	2–2	3–3	1–1	2–0	1–2	1–0	0–1	1–1
Manchester United	0–0	1–1	3–1	3–0	5–0	1–0	0–3	1–1	2–0	2–2	2–1	—	3–0	1–0	2–0	3–0	0–0	2–1	2–1	2–1	4–1	0–1
Middlesbrough	1–0	2–3	3–2	0–0	0–2	0–1	1–2	2–2	4–1	1–2	2–0	1–1	—	3–3	1–2	2–3	0–1	2–0	1–1	2–1	3–0	2–0
Norwich City	1–1	1–0	0–0	2–1	1–1	4–2	1–1	0–2	4–2	1–0	2–1	1–3	1–1	—	3–1	1–0	2–1	2–1	1–0	1–0	0–0	2–1
Nottingham Forest	0–1	0–1	1–3	3–0	1–1	1–1	0–1	0–1	1–1	1–0	0–2	0–2	1–0	0–3	—	2–0	1–0	0–2	1–2	1–2	2–1	1–1
Oldham Athletic	0–1	1–1	0–1	3–1	0–1	1–1	1–0	4–2	2–2	3–2	0–1	1–0	4–1	2–3	5–3	—	2–2	1–1	1–1	4–3	2–1	6–2
Queens Park Rangers	0–0	2–1	0–3	1–1	2–0	1–3	4–2	0–0	2–1	0–1	1–1	1–3	3–3	3–1	4–3	3–2	—	3–2	3–1	3–1	4–1	1–2
Sheffield United	1–1	0–2	1–3	4–2	1–1	0–1	1–0	3–0	2–1	1–0	1–1	2–1	2–0	0–1	0–0	2–0	1–2	—	1–1	2–0	6–0	2–2
Sheffield Wednesday	1–0	1–2	0–0	3–3	1–2	2–1	3–1	1–1	1–1	1–1	0–3	3–3	2–3	1–0	2–0	2–1	1–0	1–1	—	5–2	2–0	1–1
Southampton	2–0	2–0	1–1	1–0	2–2	1–0	0–0	4–3	1–1	2–1	0–1	0–1	2–1	3–0	1–2	1–0	1–2	3–2	1–2	—	0–0	2–2
Tottenham Hotspur	1–0	0–0	1–2	1–2	0–2	2–2	2–1	0–2	4–0	2–0	3–1	1–1	2–2	5–1	2–1	4–1	3–2	2–0	0–2	4–2	—	1–1
Wimbledon	3–2	2–3	1–1	0–0	1–2	4–0	1–3	0–1	1–0	2–0	0–1	1–2	2–0	3–0	1–0	5–2	0–2	2–0	1–1	1–2	1–1	—

Source: Premier League
Legend: Blue = home team win; Yellow = draw; Red = away team win.

== Season statistics ==
=== Top scorers ===
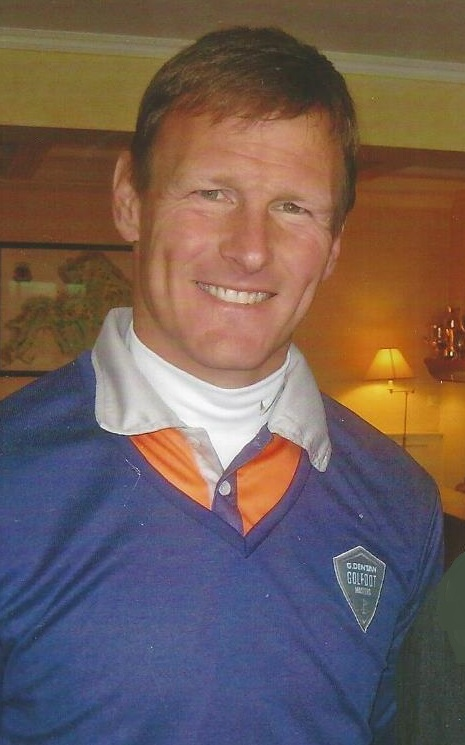
Teddy Sheringham was the top scorer in the inaugural Premier League season.

The top goalscorer in the Premier League's inaugural season was Teddy Sheringham, who scored one goal for Nottingham Forest before his early-season transfer followed by 21 for Tottenham Hotspur for a total of 22. Alan Shearer had scored 16 goals by Christmas before suffering a season-ending injury.

Rank	Player	Club	Goals
1	(England) Teddy Sheringham	Nottingham Forest; Tottenham Hotspur	22
2	(England) Les Ferdinand	Queens Park Rangers	20
3	(England) Dean Holdsworth	Wimbledon	19
4	(England) Micky Quinn	Coventry City	17
5	(England) Alan Shearer	Blackburn Rovers	16
5	(England) David White	Manchester City	16
7	(England) Chris Armstrong	Crystal Palace	15
7	(France) Eric Cantona	Leeds United; Manchester United	15
7	(England) Brian Deane	Sheffield United	15
7	(Wales) Mark Hughes	Manchester United	15
7	(England) Matt Le Tissier	Southampton	15
7	(England) Ian Wright	Arsenal	15

==== Hat-tricks ====
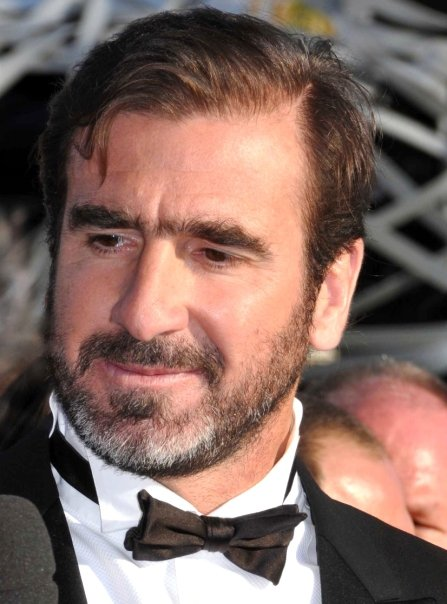
Eric Cantona scored the first ever Premier League hat-trick, in a 5–0 win over Tottenham Hotspur. In addition, he also assisted 16 goals for Leeds United and Manchester United over the season.

Player	For	Against	Result	Date
(France) Eric Cantona	Leeds United	Tottenham Hotspur	5–0 (H)	25 August 1992
(England) Mark Robins	Norwich City	Oldham Athletic	3–2 (A)	8 November 1992
(Scotland) John Hendrie	Middlesbrough	Blackburn Rovers	3–2 (H)	5 December 1992
(England) Andy Sinton	Queens Park Rangers	Everton	4–2 (H)	28 December 1992
(England) Brian Deane	Sheffield United	Ipswich Town	3–0 (H)	17 January 1993
(England) Teddy Sheringham	Tottenham Hotspur	Leeds United	4–0 (H)	22 February 1993
(Scotland) Gordon Strachan	Leeds United	Blackburn Rovers	5–2 (H)	10 April 1993
(England) Les Ferdinand	Queens Park Rangers	Nottingham Forest	4–3 (H)	10 April 1993
(England) Chris Bart-Williams	Sheffield Wednesday	Southampton	5–2 (H)	12 April 1993
(England) Les Ferdinand	Queens Park Rangers	Everton	5–3 (A)	12 April 1993
(England) Chris Sutton	Norwich City	Leeds United	4–2 (H)	14 April 1993
(England) Mark Walters	Liverpool	Coventry City	4–0 (H)	17 April 1993
(England) Rod Wallace	Leeds United	Coventry City	3–3 (A)	8 May 1993
(England) Matt Le Tissier	Southampton	Oldham Athletic	3–4 (A)	8 May 1993

Note: (H) – Home; (A) – Away

==== Historic goals ====
First ever Premier League goal was scored by Sheffield United's Brian Deane against Manchester United on 15 August 1992. Goal number 100 was scored by Leeds United's Eric Cantona against Tottenham Hotspur on 25 August 1992. Later in the season, a 1000th goal milestone was reached, when Mike Newell scored away at Nottingham Forest for Blackburn Rovers on 7 April 1993.

=== Top assists ===
Rank	Player	Club	Assists
1	(France) Eric Cantona	Leeds United; Manchester United	16
2	(England) Darren Anderton	Tottenham Hotspur	11
2	(Republic of Ireland) Niall Quinn	Manchester City	11
4	(England) Brian Deane	Sheffield United	10
4	(England) Matt Le Tissier	Southampton	10
4	(England) Jason Wilcox	Blackburn Rovers	10
7	(England) Jason Dozzell	Ipswich Town	9
7	(England) Rick Holden	Manchester City	9
7	(England) Lee Sharpe	Manchester United	9
7	(England) Teddy Sheringham	Tottenham Hotspur	9
7	(England) Andy Sinton	Queens Park Rangers	9
7	(England) Ian Woan	Nottingham Forest	9

=== Clean sheets ===
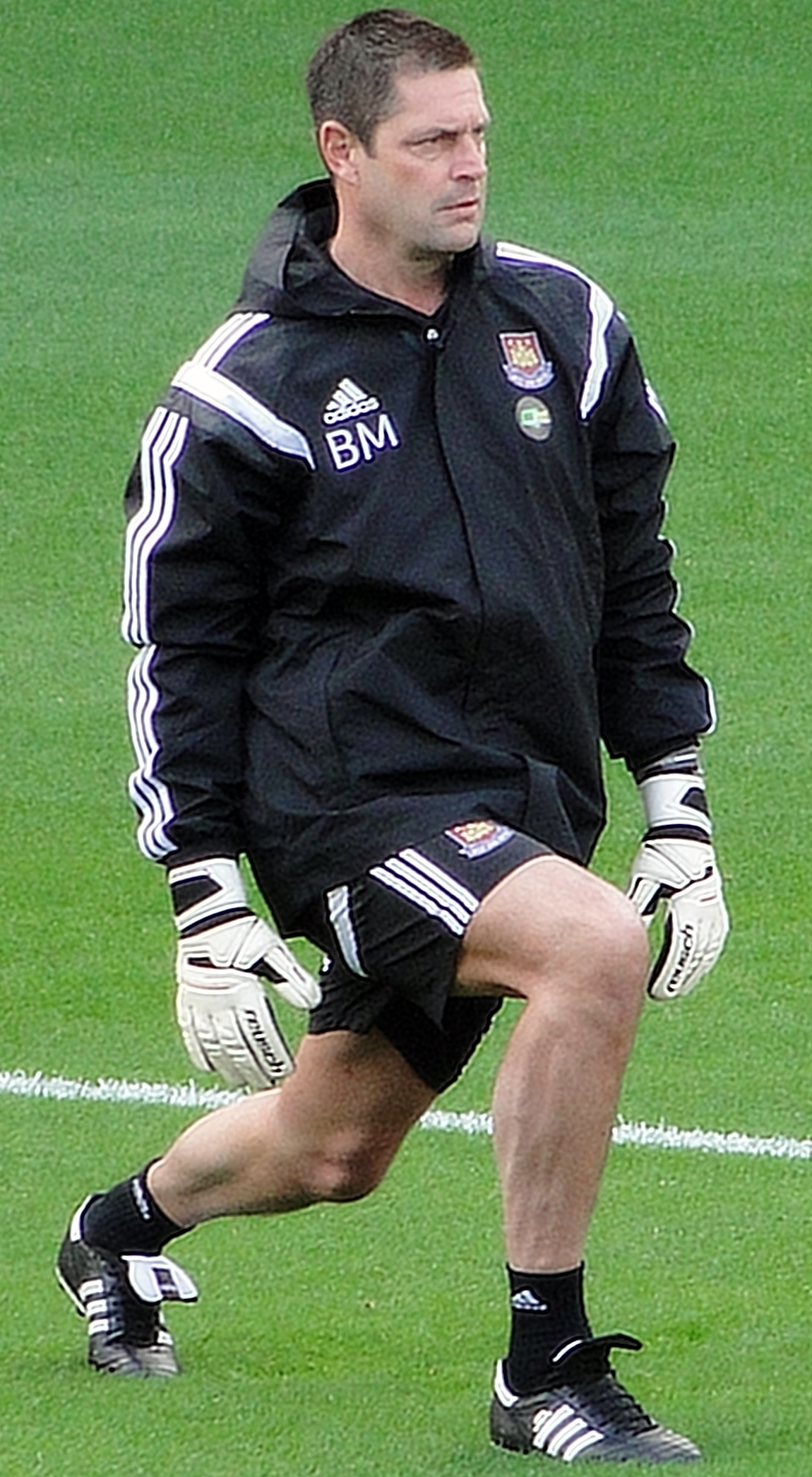
Bobby Mimms kept 19 clean sheets in the 1992–93 season, the most of all goalkeepers in the first ever Premier League season.

Rank	Player	Club	Clean sheets
1	(England) Bobby Mimms	Blackburn Rovers	19
2	(Denmark) Peter Schmeichel	Manchester United	18
3	(England) David Seaman	Arsenal	15
4	(Netherlands) Hans Segers	Wimbledon	13
5	(England) Tony Coton	Manchester City	11
5	(Scotland) Bryan Gunn	Norwich City	11
5	(England) John Lukic	Leeds United	11
5	(England) Nigel Martyn	Crystal Palace	11
5	(Wales) Neville Southall	Everton	11
10	(England) Tim Flowers	Southampton	10

=== Discipline ===
==== Player ====
- Most yellow cards: 8
  - (Northern Ireland) Iain Dowie (Southampton)
  - (England) Terry Hurlock (Southampton)
  - (Wales) Vinnie Jones (Wimbledon)
  - (England) Jamie Pollock (Middlesbrough)
  - (England) Neil Ruddock (Tottenham Hotspur)
  - (Northern Ireland) Lawrie Sanchez (Wimbledon)
  - (England) Dennis Wise (Chelsea)
- Most red cards: 2
  - (Scotland) Brian McAllister (Wimbledon)
  - (Wales) Neville Southall (Everton)

==== Club ====
- Most yellow cards: 58
  - Sheffield United
- Fewest yellow cards: 23
  - Aston Villa
  - Norwich City
- Most red cards: 5
  - Wimbledon
- Fewest red cards: 0
  - Aston Villa
  - Leeds United
  - Manchester United
  - Norwich City
  - Oldham Athletic
  - Queens Park Rangers

== Annual awards ==
Award	Winner	Club
PFA Players' Player of the Year	(Republic of Ireland) Paul McGrath	Aston Villa
PFA Young Player of the Year	(Wales) Ryan Giggs	Manchester United
FWA Footballer of the Year	(England) Chris Waddle	Sheffield Wednesday

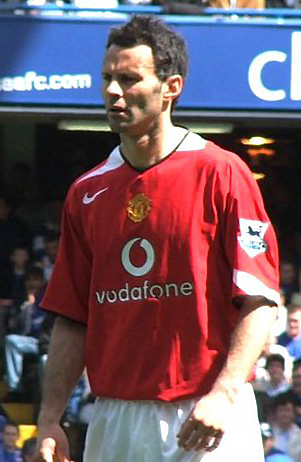
Ryan Giggs won the PFA Young Player of the Year award.

The Professional Footballers' Association (PFA) presented its annual Players' Player of the Year award to Paul McGrath, a veteran central defender who contributed to Aston Villa's second-place finish in the Premier League. Manchester United's Paul Ince came second and Blackburn's Alan Shearer third. The Young Player of the Year award was given to Ryan Giggs, the 19-year-old Manchester United left winger who had also won the award in the previous season. Giggs, who finished ahead of Tottenham's Nick Barmby and Nottingham Forest's Roy Keane, became the first player to win the award more than once.

The Football Writers' Association (the FWA) chose Chris Waddle as its Footballer of the Year. Waddle, who made his return to English football with Sheffield Wednesday after three years in France with Olympique Marseille, became the first Wednesday player to win the award in its 45-year history. McGrath and Giggs finished in second and joint third place respectively in the writers' poll.

The PFA also selected eleven players to form its Team of the Year. The team included four Manchester United players (Giggs, Ince, Peter Schmeichel and Gary Pallister) and two from Leeds United (Tony Dorigo and Gary Speed). The other members of the team were McGrath, Keane, Shearer, David Bardsley (Queens Park Rangers) and Ian Wright (Arsenal). The Manager of the Year award, chosen by a panel representing football's governing body, the media, and fans, was given to Manchester United manager Alex Ferguson. The newly formed League Managers Association also presented its own Manager of the Year award for the first time, specifically designed to recognise "the manager who made best use of the resources available to him". This award went to Dave Bassett of Sheffield United.

PFA Team of the Year
Goalkeeper	(Denmark) Peter Schmeichel (Manchester United)			
Defenders	(England) David Bardsley (Queens Park Rangers)	(England) Gary Pallister (Manchester United)	(Republic of Ireland) Paul McGrath (Aston Villa)	(England) Tony Dorigo (Leeds United)
Midfielders	(Republic of Ireland) Roy Keane (Nottingham Forest)	(England) Paul Ince (Manchester United)	(Wales) Gary Speed (Leeds United)	(Wales) Ryan Giggs (Manchester United)
Forwards	(England) Alan Shearer (Blackburn Rovers)		(England) Ian Wright (Arsenal)	

== Attendances ==
Liverpool drew the highest average home attendance in the first edition of the Premier League.

#	Football club	Home games	Average attendance
1	Liverpool	21	37,009
2	Manchester United	21	35,084
3	Aston Villa	21	29,594
4	Leeds United	21	29,228
5	Tottenham Hotspur	21	27,878
6	Sheffield Wednesday	21	27,264
7	Manchester City	21	24,698
8	Arsenal	21	24,403
9	Nottingham Forest	21	21,910
10	Everton	21	20,455
11	Sheffield United	21	19,057
12	Chelsea	21	18,754
13	Ipswich Town	21	18,188
14	Middlesbrough	21	16,724
15	Norwich City	21	16,253
16	Blackburn Rovers	21	16,248
17	Crystal Palace	21	15,726
18	Southampton	21	15,148
19	Coventry City	21	15,024
20	Queens Park Rangers	21	15,001
21	Oldham Athletic	21	12,859
22	Wimbledon	21	8,405

== See also ==
- 1992–93 in English football
