= Andy Hill (footballer) =

English footballer (born 1965)

Personal information
- Full name: Andrew Rowland Hill
- Date of birth: 20 January 1965 (age 61)
- Place of birth: Maltby, England
- Height: 5 ft 11 in (1.80 m)
- Position: Defender

Youth career
- 1981–1983: Manchester United

Senior career*
Years	Team	Apps	(Gls)
1983–1984	Manchester United	0	(0)
1984–1990	Bury	264	(10)
1990–1995	Manchester City	98	(6)
1995–1998	Port Vale	100	(1)
Total		462	(17)
- * Club domestic league appearances and goals

Andrew Rowland Hill (born 20 January 1965) is an English former professional footballer who played as a defender. In a 15-year career, he scored 19 goals in 551 league and cup appearances in the Football League and Premier League.

He began his career as a youth team player at Manchester United and played on the losing side in the 1982 FA Youth Cup final. However, he never made a first-team appearance and moved on to Bury in July 1984. He was named Bury's Player of the Year after helping the club to secure promotion out of the Fourth Division in the 1984–85 season. He spent nearly seven years at Bury, making 312 appearances, before being sold to Manchester City for £200,000 in 1990. He played for City for close to five seasons, including the opening season of the Premier League, before being sold to Port Vale for £150,000 in August 1995. He played on the losing side in the 1996 Anglo-Italian Cup final and retired in May 1998.

== Playing career ==
=== Manchester United ===
Hill was born in Maltby, Yorkshire. Upon leaving school in 1981, he began an apprenticeship at Manchester United. He played in the youth side that finished as FA Youth Cup runners-up to Watford in 1982, his teammates included Clayton Blackmore, Mark Hughes and Norman Whiteside. He also gained England Youth Honours. He later signed as a professional but never got a first-team game at Old Trafford and signed for Fourth Division club Bury in July 1984.

=== Bury ===
The "Shakers" secured the fourth and final automatic promotion place in 1984–85, and Hill was voted the club's Player of the Year. Hill was then appointed as captain by manager Martin Dobson at the age of 19. Bury finished three points above the Third Division drop zone in 1985–86. They then finished comfortably in mid-table in 1986–87, 1987–88, and 1988–89. Sam Ellis then took over as manager and led the club to the play-offs with a fifth-place finish in 1989–90 – they were then beaten by Tranmere Rovers at the semi-final stage. The following season, under new boss Mike Walsh, he was sold to Manchester City. Hill played 317 matches and scored 12 goals for the Gigg Lane club.

=== Manchester City ===
Hill signed for Manchester City in a £200,000 deal in 1990 who were flying high in the First Division eventually finishing fifth under Peter Reid's stewardship. The "Sky Blues" again finished fifth in 1991–92, with Hill scoring a career-high of four goals in his 41 appearances. He started 23 Premier League games in 1992–93, as the Maine Road club posted a ninth-place finish. The club slipped down the table under new boss Brian Horton, with Hill missing large chunks of the Horton tenure due to injury. Hill was recommended for a new contract by Horton in May 1995; however, Hill rejected chairman Francis Lee's offer of a new two-year deal.

=== Port Vale ===
In August 1995, Hill joined John Rudge's First Division Port Vale for a £150,000 fee. He made his debut in a 1–0 win over Potteries derby rivals Stoke City at the Victoria Ground on 27 August. He later featured in the FA Cup fourth round giant-killing over cup holders Everton. At the end of the 1995–96 season, he played in the 1996 Anglo-Italian Cup final, as Vale lost 5–2 to Genoa. He made 43 appearances in 1996–97, as the "Valiants" made their highest post-war finish. He played 31 games at Vale Park in the 1997–98 season, before announcing his retirement in May 1998.

== Coaching career ==
After retiring, Hill went into coaching, where he has worked for Bury as the Head of Youth Development, the Academy Director at Nevada Wonders Soccer Academy and then developed his own successful football academy, Pro-Vision North West, based in the Greater Manchester area. He was later appointed head of development at Bacup Borough. However, he resigned from his role after being diagnosed with Spinal stenosis.

== Career statistics ==
Appearances and goals by club, season and competition
Club	Season	League			FA Cup		Other		Total	
Club	Season	Division	Apps	Goals	Apps	Goals	Apps	Goals	Apps	Goals
Manchester United	1982–83	First Division	0	0	0	0	0	0	0	0
Bury	1984–85	Fourth Division	43	3	1	0	3	0	47	3
Bury	1985–86	Third Division	35	2	5	0	6	0	43	2
Bury	1986–87	Third Division	42	1	1	0	7	1	50	2
Bury	1987–88	Third Division	43	2	1	0	10	1	54	3
Bury	1988–89	Third Division	43	0	2	0	6	0	51	0
Bury	1989–90	Third Division	46	2	1	0	7	0	54	2
Bury	1990–91	Third Division	12	0	1	0	2	0	15	0
Bury	Total		264	10	12	0	41	2	317	12
Manchester City	1990–91	First Division	8	1	0	0	1	0	9	1
Manchester City	1991–92	First Division	36	4	0	0	5	0	41	4
Manchester City	1992–93	Premier League	24	1	3	0	3	0	30	1
Manchester City	1993–94	Premier League	17	0	0	0	0	0	17	0
Manchester City	1994–95	Premier League	13	0	0	0	3	0	16	0
Manchester City	Total		98	6	3	0	12	0	113	6
Port Vale	1995–96	First Division	35	0	6	0	6	0	47	0
Port Vale	1996–97	First Division	38	1	0	0	5	0	43	1
Port Vale	1997–98	First Division	27	0	2	0	2	0	31	0
Port Vale	Total		100	1	8	0	13	0	121	1
Career total			462	17	23	0	66	2	551	19

== Honours ==
Individual

- Bury F.C. Player of the Year: 1984–85

Manchester United

- FA Youth Cup runner-up: 1982

Bury

- Football League Fourth Division fourth-place promotion: 1984–85

Port Vale

- Anglo-Italian Cup runner-up: 1996
