= 1990–91 Manchester City F.C. season =

English football club season

Manchester City
1990–91 season
- Manager: Howard Kendall (until 7 November); Peter Reid (player-manager; from 7 November)
- Stadium: Maine Road
- First Division: 5th
- FA Cup: Fifth round
- League Cup: Third round
- Full Members Cup: Fourth round
- Top goalscorer: League: All: Niall Quinn (21)
- Highest home attendance: 39,194 vs Sunderland; 10 May 1991
- Lowest home attendance: 12,204 vs Torquay United; 10 October 1990
- Average home league attendance: 27,769 (6th highest in league)
Home colours

The 1990–91 season was Manchester City's second consecutive season in the top tier of English football, the Football League First Division.

== Season summary ==
Howard Kendall built a strong Manchester City side that spent the first few months of the season near the top of the table, but left in November, with City in fifth, to return to Everton, justifying his move by claiming that Manchester City was his affair but Everton was his marriage. Midfielder Peter Reid was named as caretaker before being appointed permanent City manager; he led the Mancunians to fifth place. Andy Hill became Peter Reid's first major signing as a manager paying Bury £200,000 for his capture.

Irish striker Niall Quinn was City's top scorer with 21 goals in all competitions. He was named the club's Player of the Year.

== Football League First Division ==
=== League table ===
Pos	Team	Pld	W	D	L	GF	GA	GD	Pts	Qualification or relegation
3	Crystal Palace	38	20	9	9	50	41	+9	69	
4	Leeds United	38	19	7	12	65	47	+18	64	
5	Manchester City	38	17	11	10	64	53	+11	62	
6	Manchester United	38	16	12	10	58	45	+13	59 (Note: Arsenal deducted two points; Manchester United deducted one point due to a brawl in a game between both teams.)	Qualification for the Cup Winners' Cup first round
7	Wimbledon	38	14	14	10	53	46	+7	56	

Source: World Football
Rules for classification: 1) Points; 2) Goal difference; 3) Goals scored

=== Results summary ===
Overall								Home						Away					
Pld	W	D	L	GF	GA	GD	Pts	W	D	L	GF	GA	GD	W	D	L	GF	GA	GD
38	17	11	10	64	53	+11	62	12	3	4	35	25	+10	5	8	6	29	28	+1

=== Results ===
Date	Opponent	Venue	Result	Attendance	Scorers
24 August 1990	Tottenham Hotspur	A	1–3	33,501	Quinn
31 August 1990	Everton	H	1–0	31,456	Heath
4 September 1990	Aston Villa	H	2–1	30,199	Ward, Pointon
7 September 1990	Sheffield United	A	1–1	21,895	White
14 September 1990	Norwich City	H	2–1	26,247	Quinn, Brennan
21 September 1990	Chelsea	A	1–1	20,924	Ward (pen)
28 September 1990	Wimbledon	A	1–1	6,158	Allen
6 October 1990	Coventry City	H	2–1	26,198	Harper, Quinn
10 October 1990	Derby County	A	1–1	17,884	Ward
27 October 1990	Manchester United	H	3–3	36,427	White (2), Hendry
2 November 1990	Sunderland	A	1–1	23,137	White
10 November 1990	Leeds United	H	2–3	27,782	Ward (pen), White
16 November 1990	Luton Town	A	2–2	9,564	White, Redmond
23 November 1990	Liverpool	A	2–2	37,849	Ward, Quinn
30 November 1990	Queens Park Rangers	H	2–1	25,080	Quinn (2)
14 December 1990	Tottenham Hotspur	H	2–1	31,263	Redmond, Ward
21 December 1990	Crystal Palace	H	0–2	25,321	
25 December 1990	Southampton	A	1–2	16,029	Quinn
28 December 1990	Nottingham Forest	A	3–1	24,937	Quinn (2), Clarke
31 December 1990	Arsenal	H	0–1	30,579	
12 January 1991	Everton	A	0–2	22,774	
18 January 1991	Sheffield United	H	2–0	25,741	Ward (2)
1 February 1991	Norwich City	A	2–1	15,194	Quinn, White
8 February 1991	Chelsea	H	2–1	25,116	Megson, White
1 March 1991	Queens Park Rangers	A	0–1	12,376	
4 March 1991	Luton Town	H	3–0	20,404	Quinn (2), Allen
8 March 1991	Liverpool	H	0–3	33,150	
15 March 1991	Wimbledon	H	1–1	21,089	Ward
22 March 1991	Coventry City	A	1–3	13,198	Allen
29 March 1991	Southampton	H	3–3	23,163	Brennan, White, Allen
1 April 1991	Crystal Palace	A	3–1	18,001	Quinn (3)
5 April 1991	Nottingham Forest	H	3–1	25,169	Ward (pen), Quinn, Redmond
9 April 1991	Leeds United	A	2–1	28,757	Hill
16 April 1991	Arsenal	A	2–2	38,412	Ward (pen), White
19 April 1991	Derby County	H	2–1	24,037	Quinn, White
22 April 1991	Aston Villa	A	5–1	24,168	White (4), Brennan
3 May 1991	Manchester United	A	0–1	45,286	
10 May 1991	Sunderland	H	3–2	39,194	Quinn (2), White

=== FA Cup ===
Round	Date	Opponent	Venue	Result
R3	4 January 1991	Burnley	A	0–1
R4	25 January 1991	Port Vale	A	1–2
R5	15 February 1991	Notts County	A	1–0

=== League Cup ===
Round	Date	Opponent	Venue	Result
R2 1st leg	25 September 1990	Torquay United	A	0–4
R2 2nd leg	10 October 1990	Torquay United	H	0–0
R3	29 October 1990	Arsenal	H	2–1

== Full Members' Cup ==
19 December 1990 Second round, Northern Section	Manchester City	2-1	Middlesbrough	Manchester
				Stadium: Maine Road

22 January 1991 Third round, Northern Section	Sheffield United	0-2	Manchester City	Sheffield
				Stadium: Bramall Lane

20 February 1991 Semi-finals, Northern Section	Leeds United	2-0	Manchester City	Leeds
				Stadium: Elland Road

== Kit ==
City's kit was manufactured by English company Umbro and sponsored by Japanese electronics manufacturer Brother.

== Squad ==
Squad at end of season

Note: Flags indicate national team as defined under FIFA eligibility rules; some limited exceptions apply. Players may hold more than one non-FIFA nationality.

Pos.	Nation	Player
GK	ENG	Tony Coton
GK	WAL	Martyn Margetson
GK	WAL	Andy Dibble
DF	ENG	Alan Harper
DF	ENG	Neil Pointon
DF	ENG	Steve Redmond
DF	ENG	David Brightwell
DF	ENG	Ian Brightwell
DF	SCO	Colin Hendry
DF	ENG	Andy Hill
MF	ENG	Mark Brennan
MF	ENG	Adrian Heath

Pos.	Nation	Player
MF	ENG	Steve McMahon
MF	ENG	Paul Lake
MF	ENG	Gary Megson
MF	ENG	Mike Quigley
MF	ENG	Peter Reid (player-manager)
MF	ENG	Mark Ward
MF	ENG	David White
FW	ENG	Clive Allen
FW	ENG	Jason Beckford
FW	ENG	Wayne Clarke
FW	ENG	Ashley Ward
FW	IRL	Niall Quinn

=== Left club during season ===
Note: Flags indicate national team as defined under FIFA eligibility rules; some limited exceptions apply. Players may hold more than one non-FIFA nationality.

Pos.	Nation	Player
DF	ENG	Mark Seagraves (to Bolton Wanderers)

== Transfers ==
=== Out ===
- Andy Hinchcliffe - Everton
- Mark Seagraves - Bolton Wanderers

=== In ===
- Andy Hill - Bury
