= 1989–90 Manchester City F.C. season =

English football club season

Manchester City
1989–90 season
- Chairman: Peter Swales
- Manager: Mel Machin (until 26 November 1989); Howard Kendall (from 13 December 1989)
- Stadium: Maine Road
- First Division: 14th
- FA Cup: Third round
- League Cup: Fourth round
- Full Members Cup: First round
- Top goalscorer: League: Allen (10); All: White/Allen (11)
- Highest home attendance: 43,246 vs Manchester United; 20 September 1989
- Lowest home attendance: 17,874 vs Brentford; 4 October 1989
- Average home league attendance: 27,975 (4th highest in league)
Home colours

The 1989–90 season was Manchester City's first season back in the top tier of English football, the Football League First Division.

== Football League First Division ==
=== League table ===
Pos	Team	Pld	W	D	L	GF	GA	GD	Pts	Qualification or relegation
12	Coventry City	38	14	7	17	39	59	−20	49	
13	Manchester United	38	13	9	16	46	47	−1	48	Qualification for the European Cup Winners' Cup first round (Note: Manchester United qualified for the UEFA Cup Winners' Cup as the 1989–90 FA Cup winners.)
14	Manchester City	38	12	12	14	43	52	−9	48	
15	Crystal Palace	38	13	9	16	42	66	−24	48	
16	Derby County	38	13	7	18	43	40	+3	46	

Source: World Football
Rules for classification: 1) Points; 2) Goal difference; 3) Goals scored

=== Results summary ===
Overall								Home						Away					
Pld	W	D	L	GF	GA	GD	Pts	W	D	L	GF	GA	GD	W	D	L	GF	GA	GD
38	12	12	14	43	52	−9	48	9	4	6	26	21	+5	3	8	8	17	31	−14

=== Matches ===
Date	Opponent	Venue	Result	Attendance	Scorers
19 August 1989	Liverpool	A	1–3	35,628	Hinchcliffe
23 August 1989	Southampton	H	1–2	25,416	Gleghorn
26 August 1989	Tottenham Hotspur	H	1–1	32,004	White
30 August 1989	Coventry City	A	1–2	16,129	White
9 September 1989	Queens Park Rangers	H	1–0	23,420	Allen
16 September 1989	Wimbledon	A	0–1	6,922	
23 September 1989	Manchester United	H	5–1	43,246	Oldfield (2), Bishop, Hinchcliffe, Morley
30 September 1989	Luton Town	H	3–1	23,863	Bishop, Brightwell, Oldfield
14 October 1989	Arsenal	A	0–4	40,393	
22 October 1989	Aston Villa	H	0–2	23,354	
28 October 1989	Chelsea	A	1–1	21,917	Allen
3 November 1989	Crystal Palace	H	3–0	23,768	White, Morley, Allen
10 November 1989	Derby County	A	0–6	19,239	
17 November 1989	Nottingham Forest	H	0–3	26,238	
24 November 1989	Charlton Athletic	A	1–1	8,857	Allen
1 December 1989	Liverpool	H	1–4	31,641	Allen (pen
8 December 1989	Southampton	A	1–2	15,832	Allen
16 December 1989	Everton	A	0–0	21,737	
25 December 1989	Norwich City	H	1–0	29,534	Allen
29 December 1989	Millwall	H	2–0	28,084	White (2)
1 January 1990	Sheffield Wednesday	A	0–2	28,756	
13 January 1990	Tottenham Hotspur	A	1–1	26,384	Hendry
19 January 1990	Coventry City	H	1–0	24,345	White
2 February 1990	Manchester United	A	1–1	40,274	Brightwell
9 February 1990	Wimbledon	H	1–1	24,126	Hendry
23 February 1990	Charlton Athletic	H	1–2	24,030	White
2 March 1990	Nottingham Forest	A	0–1	22,644	
9 March 1990	Arsenal	H	1–1	29,087	White
16 March 1990	Luton Town	A	1–1	9,765	Allen (pen)
20 March 1990	Chelsea	H	1–1	24,670	Quinn
1 April 1990	Aston Villa	A	2–1	24,797	M. Ward, Reid
6 April 1990	Millwall	A	1–1	10,265	M. Ward
10 April 1990	Queens Park Rangers	A	3–1	8,437	Allen, Hendry, M. Ward
13 April 1990	Sheffield Wednesday	H	2–1	33,022	Quinn, Heath
15 April 1990	Norwich City	A	1–0	18,914	Heath
20 April 1990	Everton	H	1–0	32,144	Quinn
27 April 1990	Derby County	H	0–1	29,542	
4 May 1990	Crystal Palace	A	2–2	20,056	Allen, Quinn

=== FA Cup ===
Round	Date	Opponent	Venue	Result
R3 1st leg	5 January 1990	Millwall	H	0–0
R3 2nd leg	8 January 1990	Millwall	A	1–1
R3 3rd leg	14 January 1990	Millwall	A	3–1

=== League Cup ===
Round	Date	Opponent	Venue	Result
R2 1st leg	18 September 1989	Brentford	A	2–1
R2 2nd leg	4 October 1989	Brentford	H	4–1
R3	25 October 1989	Arsenal	H	3–1
Round of 16	21 November 1989	Coventry City	H	0–1

== Full Members' Cup ==
29 November 1989 Second round, Northern Section	Nottingham Forest	3–2	Manchester City	West Bridgford
				Stadium: City Ground

== Squad ==
Note: Flags indicate national team as defined under FIFA eligibility rules; some limited exceptions apply. Players may hold more than one non-FIFA nationality.

Pos.	Nation	Player
GK	WAL	Andy Dibble
GK	ENG	Paul Cooper
DF	ENG	Andy Hinchcliffe
DF	ENG	Steve Redmond
DF	ENG	Mark Seagraves
DF	SCO	Colin Hendry (from October)
DF	ENG	Alan Harper
MF	ENG	Paul Lake
MF	ENG	Ian Brightwell

Pos.	Nation	Player
MF	ENG	Gary Megson
MF	ENG	Mark Ward
MF	ENG	Peter Reid
FW	ENG	David White
FW	ENG	Jason Beckford
FW	IRL	Niall Quinn (from March)
FW	ENG	Clive Allen
FW	ENG	Wayne Clarke
FW	ENG	Ashley Ward
FW	ENG	Adrian Heath (from February)

=== Left club during season ===
Note: Flags indicate national team as defined under FIFA eligibility rules; some limited exceptions apply. Players may hold more than one non-FIFA nationality.

Pos.	Nation	Player
FW	ENG	Nigel Gleghorn (to Birmingham City)
FW	ENG	Trevor Morley (to West Ham United)
MF	ENG	Ian Bishop (to West Ham United)
FW	ENG	Justin Fashanu (to West Ham United)

Pos.	Nation	Player
DF	ENG	Gerry Taggart (to Barnsley)
DF	ENG	Gary Fleming (to Barnsley)
MF	SCO	Neil McNab (to Tranmere Rovers)
FW	ENG	David Oldfield (to Leicester City)
DF	ENG	Brian Gayle (to Ipswich Town)
