= Niall Quinn =

Irish association football player and manager

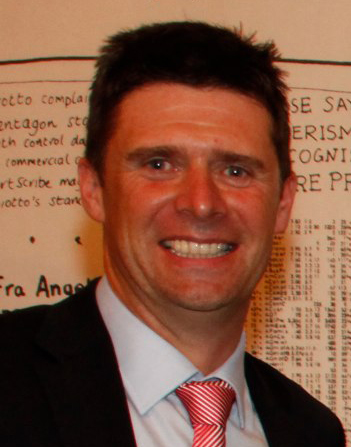
- Quinn in 2011

Personal information
- Full name: Niall John Quinn
- Date of birth: 6 October 1966 (age 60)
- Place of birth: Dublin, Ireland
- Height: 1.93 m (6 ft 4 in)
- Position: Striker

Youth career
- 1975–: Manortown United
- –1983: Lourdes Celtic
- Arsenal

Senior career*
| Years | Team | Apps | (Gls) |
| 1983–1990 | Arsenal | 67 | (14) |
| 1990–1996 | Manchester City | 204 | (66) |
| 1996–2002 | Sunderland | 203 | (61) |
| Total | | 475 | (141) |

International career
| 1985 | Republic of Ireland U17 | 5 | (4) |
| 1986–1989 | Republic of Ireland U21 | 5 | (0) |
| 1990 | Republic of Ireland U23 | 1 | (1) |
| 1990 | Republic of Ireland B | 1 | (2) |
| 1986–2002 | Republic of Ireland | 92 | (21) |

Managerial career
- 2006: Sunderland
- * Club domestic league appearances and goals

Niall John Quinn (honorary MBE; born 6 October 1966) is an Irish former professional footballer, manager, businessman and sports television pundit.

As a player, he was a striker who played top flight football for Arsenal, Manchester City and Sunderland, with spells in the Premier League for both City and Sunderland. Quinn also received 92 caps for the Republic of Ireland national team, scoring 21 times, which makes him Ireland's second highest goalscorer of all time. He also appeared with the Irish team at the UEFA European Football Championship of 1988 and two FIFA World Cups in 1990 and 2002.

After his football career he was part of a consortium to buy Sunderland and became the club's chairman. He also had a spell as manager before stepping down to a role of club director. He left the club in February 2012 and has since worked as a pundit namely on Sky Sports.

== Club career ==
=== Early career and Gaelic games ===
Born in Perrystown, Quinn started playing association football for his local club Manortown United as a nine-year-old. Initially a goalkeeper, he did not play outfield until he was twelve. He later moved to Lourdes Celtic in Crumlin and played as a centre-back or midfielder. It was not until he represented Drimnagh Castle Secondary School in association football that he finally became a centre-forward.

The son of All-Ireland Minor winning Tipperary hurler Billy, Quinn also participated in Gaelic games, playing Gaelic football and hurling for local Perrystown club Robert Emmets. His ability saw him represent his county, playing for the Dublin GAA minors in both codes, and in July 1983 Quinn captained the Dublin Colleges Under-18 Gaelic football team on a tour of Australia. His sporting career came to a crossroads when, aged 16, he played in the 1983 All-Ireland Minor Hurling Championship final, was offered a contract to play professional Australian rules football and received an offer from Arsenal to pursue a career in association football. He later returned to play Gaelic football for County Kildare club Eadestown after his retirement, winning a junior C county title in 2008.

=== Arsenal ===
After an unsuccessful trial at Fulham, he signed professional forms with English club Arsenal in 1983. He was signed as a centre-forward, but also had a brief spell as a centre-half for the Arsenal third team. After scoring 18 goals in 18 reserve matches in the first half of the 1985–86 season, Quinn was included in the first-team squad for a match against Liverpool. Quinn scored in the match as Arsenal recorded a 2–0 win. He made a further 11 league appearances for Arsenal that season, but failed to score as they finished seventh in the league. The end of the season brought Quinn his first call-up to the Republic of Ireland national team.

Quinn found himself playing under a new manager for the following season, as George Graham was appointed in place of Don Howe. Quinn had a regular place in the side that season, appearing in 35 league games and scoring eight goals. He also collected a Football League Cup winner's medal as Arsenal triumphed 2–1 over Liverpool in the final. However, after Arsenal signed another target man, Alan Smith, in the 1987 close season, Quinn struggled to get into the team. Over the next three seasons he managed a total of just 20 league appearances and five goals – his three appearances in 1988–89 not being enough for a title medal. Quinn's lack of opportunities led him to submit a written transfer request at the start of the 1989–90 season. In total he scored 20 goals in 94 appearances for Arsenal, of which 81 were starts.

=== Manchester City ===
Manchester City manager Howard Kendall signed Quinn for £800,000 in March 1990, shortly before the transfer deadline. He marked his debut with a goal, in a 1–1 draw against Chelsea at Maine Road. He scored 22 times in his first full season, and he went on to spend six years at the club, scoring 78 goals in 245 appearances; his time at City was hampered by a cruciate ligament injury in 1993–94. Although he returned to the side the following season, he managed just eight goals from 35 games.

His most notable game for City was 20 April 1991 when he scored early on and saved a penalty as City beat Derby County 2–1, relegating Derby in the process. City goalkeeper Tony Coton had been sent off before half time for fouling Dean Saunders to concede the penalty. At this time teams rarely named goalkeepers as substitutes, so Quinn replaced Coton in goal. Other notable games included the Manchester derby on 7 November 1993, in which he scored twice in the first half to put City 2–0 up against United by half time, although a remarkable United comeback saw City lose 3–2.

In the 1993 close season, Everton made a bid to sign Quinn and a further bid was made early in the 1993–94 season, but both bids were rejected and Quinn remained at Maine Road for a further three seasons. A cruciate ligament injury sustained in a match against Sheffield Wednesday in November 1993 caused Quinn to miss the majority of the 1993–94 season, and prevented him from playing in the 1994 FIFA World Cup. He returned at the start of the 1994–95 season, but the partnership forged by Uwe Rösler and Paul Walsh in his absence meant he was not always a starter. In an attempt to reduce the wage bill, Manchester City tried to sell Quinn in the 1995 close season, but a proposed move to Lisbon club Sporting fell through after failure to agree contractual terms.

He managed a total of 193 league appearances in over six years at Maine Road, and scored a total of 64 goals for them.

Manchester City supporters created a song about Quinn, "Niall Quinn's Disco Pants", during a night out on a pre-season tour of Italy, in 1992. There had been a bust-up with City team-mate Steve McMahon and Quinn had removed his torn and bloodied shirt and was dancing with Rick Holden wearing just a pair of cut-off jeans. He was "hardly aware" that there were a group of hardcore City fans watching and they treated him to "the first performance of the song that will follow me till the end of my career." The song was later adopted by Sunderland fans and released as a single by the club's dedicated fanzine A Love Supreme. It reached no. 56 in the UK Singles Chart in April 1999.

=== Sunderland ===
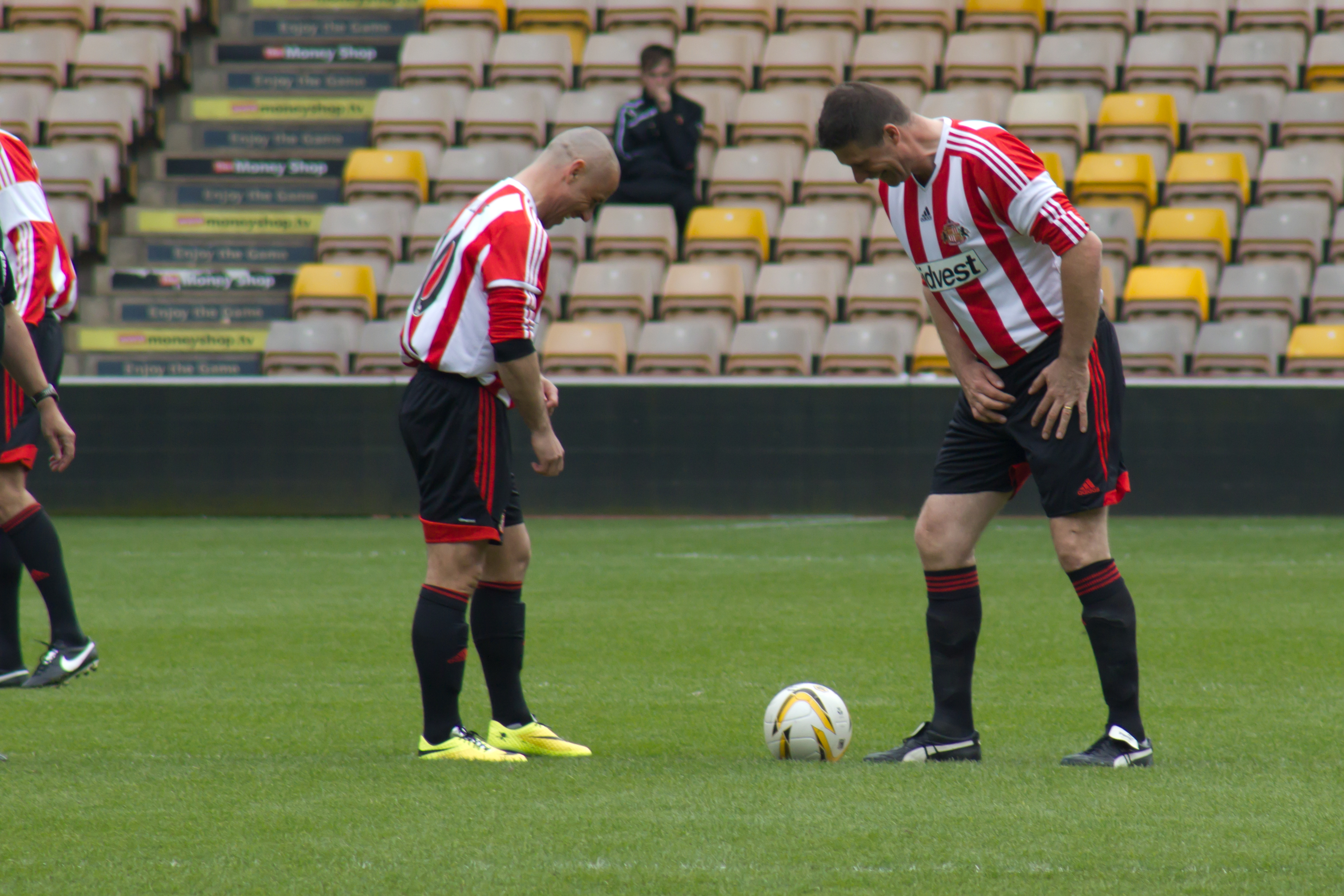
While at Sunderland, Quinn is noted for his partnership with fellow striker Kevin Phillips; both players scored a combined 194 goals in all competitions within six seasons

Quinn finished his career with a highly successful spell at Sunderland, joining the north-east club in August 1996 for a club record £1.3 million, although he missed six months of his first season due to a knee injury – similar to the one which ruined his World Cup chances three years earlier. Before his injury, he had got off to a fine start to his Sunderland career, finding the net twice on his debut in a 4–1 win at Nottingham Forest. In his absence from September to March, Sunderland struggled and although he was back in action by the end of the season, they were relegated.

His partnership with striker Kevin Phillips, signed in the 1997 close season, was one of the most prolific in the Football League in the late 1990s/early 2000s (a combined 194 goals for both players in all competitions from 1997–98 to 2002–03) and helped the club to regain promotion to the Premiership for the 1999–2000 season. In March 1999, Quinn again had to play in goal, this time replacing the injured Thomas Sørensen in a game against Bradford City. In similar circumstances to when playing for Manchester City against Derby County in 1991, Quinn scored and then went in goal, and kept a clean sheet to help his side win. He also has the distinction of being the first player to score at Sunderland's Stadium of Light, against Manchester City in 1997. He quickly became a legend at Sunderland, winning both the Sunderland and North East Sportswriters' Player of the Year awards in 1999 after scoring 21 goals in Sunderland's record-breaking Division One title-winning season. His final appearance for Sunderland came on 19 October 2002 against West Ham United.

In a league career lasting 17 years, he had played a total of 475 times in the Premier League and Football League, scoring 141 goals.

== International career ==
Quinn played in the qualifiers for the 1986 UEFA European Under-18 Football Championship, and made his Irish international debut at under-17 level against Northern Ireland at Seaview in a 6–1 friendly win in January 1985, the first ever fixture between the two nations. Quinn scored a hat trick, as did Eamonn Dolan. However, Arsenal refused permission for Quinn to travel to the 1985 FIFA World Youth Championships.

Quinn made his senior debut as a substitute against the host nation in the Iceland Triangular Tournament in 1986. Quinn played for his country at two World Cups, in 1990 and 2002; he missed the 1994 FIFA World Cup because of injury. Quinn was also a member of the Irish squad that participated in the 1988 European Championship playing just once, as a substitute in the Republic of Ireland's 1–0 win over England in Stuttgart.

Quinn scored the equaliser against the Netherlands in the 1990 FIFA World Cup which allowed the Republic to progress to the second round of that tournament. In the qualifiers for the 2002 FIFA World Cup, he scored against Cyprus on his 35th birthday to break the all-time goalscoring record, then held by Frank Stapleton. In the tournament proper, his header set up Robbie Keane's late equaliser against Germany, which was the only goal Germany conceded before the final. In the second-round, with the Republic behind 1–0 to Spain, it was a foul on Quinn that led to Ireland's last-minute penalty, converted by Robbie Keane, which tied the game and brought extra-time, but the Republic lost 3–2 in the resulting penalty shootout.

After the tournament, he announced his retirement from international football, amassing 92 caps. At the time, he was his country's all-time top scorer with 21 goals; this record was surpassed in October 2004 by Robbie Keane.

Quinn had a testimonial match between Sunderland and the Republic of Ireland in 2002. He donated the entire proceeds to charity, an act for which he received a number of awards, including an honorary MBE. Instead of receiving an appearance fee for the game, all the players received a letter from a sick child. Quinn played for both teams during the match, which raised over £1 million. The Republic of Ireland won the match 3–0.

== Post-playing career ==
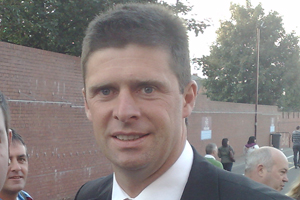
Quinn at Villa Park, 2008

Quinn retired in 2003 at the age of 37, taking a brief coaching role at Sunderland. He made a single league appearance for Thai Premier League side BEC Tero Sasana in March 2006 to promote the league and the side's link with Arsenal. His post-playing career has involved stints as chairman of Sunderland and, on an interim basis, the FAI, as well as journalism and commentary, charitable work and business pursuits. The Times reported that the Labour Party had approached Quinn about potentially running in Dublin Bay North in the 2024 general election, and he was mooted as a potential candidate for Fianna Fáil in the 2025 Irish presidential election, but ultimately did not run in either.

=== Football executive and coach ===
Heading the Drumaville Consortium of wealthy Irish businessmen, in June 2006, Quinn successfully brokered a deal to buy a controlling stake in Sunderland. In July, Quinn became the chairman and manager of Sunderland. The deal was finalised on 27 July, with sufficient shares being sold to the consortium in order for them to take complete control.

His managerial career had an inauspicious start as Sunderland lost its first four consecutive league games. On 22 August, Sunderland played Bury away in the League Cup where they lost 2–0. After the match, Quinn said that a new manager would be appointed by Sunderland's next game. Quinn stepped to one side (to continue in his role as Sunderland chairman) paving the way for Roy Keane to take charge. This was unexpected considering the rift between the two arising from Keane's infamous ejection from the 2002 World Cup. Keane was appointed manager of the club on 28 August. The appointment became a success, with Sunderland clinching an immediate Premier League comeback as Football League Championship champions. Quinn made substantial amounts of money available for buying new players, as he had a declared ambition to establish Sunderland as a top club.

In October 2011, Ellis Short replaced Quinn as chairman of Sunderland. Quinn was appointed as Director of International Development on behalf of the club and remained in this role until stepping down in February 2012 and after six years involved with the running of the club saying "Everything is in place for Sunderland to really make a statement, which was always my aim".

Quinn was interim deputy chief executive officer of the Football Association of Ireland from January to September 2020, choosing to go without salary until the financial future of the organisation could be secured. In 2025 he was appointed Director of Coaching at Athletic Union League side Dublin Celtic.

=== Media work ===
Quinn released an autobiography Niall Quinn – The Autobiography (2002), which was ghostwritten by Tom Humphries. It won the Best Autobiography category in the inaugural British Sports Book Awards. It was also nominated for a William Hill Sports Book of the Year award. The book is not structured chronologically, but rather in the context of Quinn's career swansong, the 2002 World Cup in South Korea and Japan.

In 2012, Quinn started commentating for Sky Sports, often alongside Martin Tyler, for televised matches involving his former teams. He ceased commenting in 2025, having found himself with little to say about the Pep Guardiola-influenced possession era of the sport, saying "When every match you are watching has the goalkeeper and the two centre-backs getting the most touches of the ball in both teams, I didn't know what to say about the game". He redirected his focus to Team Taca, his podcast network that enables soccer clubs to produce private and localised club podcasts, targeting the American market.

=== Businessman ===
In 2011, Quinn launched Q Sat, a satellite broadband company in Ireland. He invested €700,000 in the venture, which provided internet service to 3000 homes in Ireland before shutting down in 2017.

=== Charitable work and recognition ===
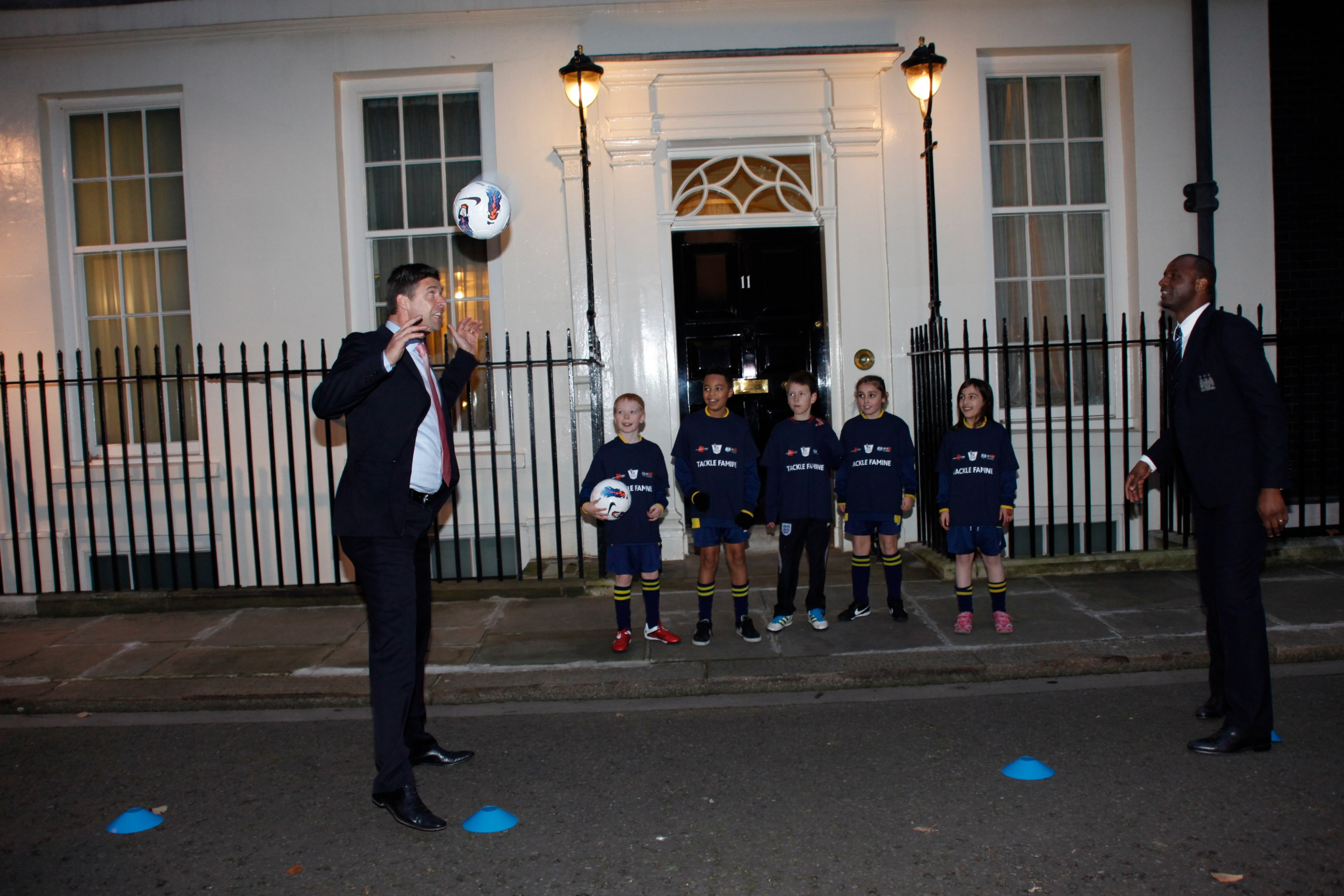
Quinn and Patrick Vieira participate in a game of headers at 11 Downing Street, while schoolchildren from Gillespie Primary School look on, 2011

A large portion of the proceeds from Quinn's 2002 testimonial match were donated to City Hospitals Sunderland to help fund the building of a new children's centre. The centre was subsequently named "The Niall Quinn Children's Centre" in his honour and Quinn officially opened it in 2004. He is an advocate of and fundraiser for the Irish Professional Footballers Benevolent Association, a welfare organisation which seeks to raise awareness of and alleviate health and financial issues ex-professionals are susceptible to.

Quinn was awarded an honorary Member of the British Empire in 2003 for his services to British charities. In 2008, he received the James Joyce Award of the Literary & Historical Society in University College Dublin. In 2010, Quinn was named a patron of the Sir Bobby Robson Foundation. He won the 2011 North East Football Writers' Association's Personality of the Year, and in 2013 he was granted the Freedom of Sunderland award by the city of Sunderland.

== Personal life ==
Both Quinn's parents are from Thurles, County Tipperary. His father as well as his uncles on his mother's side played hurling for Tipperary. He was born in Dublin. and later settled in Kildare. He has been married to the Irish model Gillian Roe since 1992, and they have two children: Aisling and Michael. Quinn struggled to adapt to post-playing life, the loss of his teammates' presence and his identity as a player, which affected his marriage. In 2005, Quinn was banned for driving for three months and ordered to pay a €200 fine after admitting drink-driving. A history enthusiast, Quinn completed a master's degree in 2022 with a thesis on revolutionary and FAI luminary Oscar Traynor. He is a keen golfer, live music enthusiast, and horse racing fan, having attended the Cheltenham Festival 24 years in a row.

== Career statistics ==
=== Club ===
Appearances and goals by club, season and competition
| Club | Season | League | | | FA Cup | | League Cup | | Other | | Total | |
| Club | Season | Division | Apps | Goals | Apps | Goals | Apps | Goals | Apps | Goals | Apps | Goals |
|---|---|---|---|---|---|---|---|---|---|---|---|---|
| Arsenal | 1985–86 | First Division | 12 | 1 | 3 | 0 | 2 | 0 | 0 | 0 | 17 | 1 |
| Arsenal | 1986–87 | First Division | 35 | 8 | 4 | 1 | 9 | 3 | 0 | 0 | 48 | 12 |
| Arsenal | 1987–88 | First Division | 11 | 2 | 2 | 0 | 3 | 0 | 0 | 0 | 16 | 2 |
| Arsenal | 1988–89 | First Division | 3 | 1 | 0 | 0 | 0 | 0 | 0 | 0 | 3 | 1 |
| Arsenal | 1989–90 | First Division | 6 | 2 | 1 | 1 | 2 | 1 | 1 | 0 | 10 | 4 |
| Arsenal | Total | | 67 | 14 | 10 | 2 | 16 | 4 | 1 | 0 | 94 | 20 |
| Manchester City | 1989–90 | First Division | 9 | 4 | 0 | 0 | 0 | 0 | 0 | 0 | 9 | 4 |
| Manchester City | 1990–91 | First Division | 38 | 20 | 2 | 1 | 3 | 0 | 0 | 0 | 43 | 21 |
| Manchester City | 1991–92 | First Division | 35 | 12 | 1 | 0 | 3 | 2 | 0 | 0 | 39 | 14 |
| Manchester City | 1992–93 | Premier League | 39 | 9 | 5 | 1 | 3 | 0 | 0 | 0 | 47 | 10 |
| Manchester City | 1993–94 | Premier League | 15 | 5 | 0 | 0 | 3 | 1 | 0 | 0 | 18 | 6 |
| Manchester City | 1994–95 | Premier League | 35 | 8 | 4 | 0 | 6 | 2 | 0 | 0 | 45 | 10 |
| Manchester City | 1995–96 | Premier League | 32 | 8 | 4 | 2 | 3 | 1 | 0 | 0 | 39 | 11 |
| Manchester City | Total | | 193 | 66 | 16 | 4 | 21 | 6 | 0 | 0 | 240 | 76 |
| Sunderland | 1996–97 | Premier League | 12 | 2 | 0 | 0 | 1 | 1 | 0 | 0 | 13 | 3 |
| Sunderland | 1997–98 | First Division | 35 | 14 | 2 | 1 | 0 | 0 | 0 | 0 | 37 | 15 |
| Sunderland | 1998–99 | First Division | 39 | 18 | 2 | 0 | 5 | 3 | 0 | 0 | 46 | 21 |
| Sunderland | 1999–2000 | Premier League | 37 | 14 | 1 | 0 | 0 | 0 | 0 | 0 | 38 | 14 |
| Sunderland | 2000–01 | Premier League | 34 | 7 | 3 | 1 | 0 | 0 | 0 | 0 | 37 | 8 |
| Sunderland | 2001–02 | Premier League | 38 | 6 | 1 | 0 | 0 | 0 | 0 | 0 | 39 | 6 |
| Sunderland | 2002–03 | Premier League | 8 | 0 | 0 | 0 | 0 | 0 | 0 | 0 | 8 | 0 |
| Sunderland | Total | | 203 | 61 | 9 | 2 | 6 | 4 | 1 | 0 | 219 | 67 |
| Career total | | | 473 | 141 | 35 | 8 | 43 | 14 | 1 | 0 | 552 | 163 |

=== International ===
Scores and results list Ireland's goal tally first, score column indicates score after each Quinn goal.

List of international goals scored by Niall Quinn
| No. | Date | Venue | Opponent | Score | Result | Competition |
|---|---|---|---|---|---|---|
| 1 | 10 November 1987 | Dalymount Park, Dublin | Israel | | 5–0 | Friendly |
| 2 | 2 June 1990 | National Stadium, Ta' Qali, Malta | Malta | | 3–0 | Friendly |
| 3 | 21 June 1990 | Stadio Renzo Barbera, Palermo, Italy | Netherlands | | 1–1 | 1990 World Cup |
| 4 | 17 October 1990 | Lansdowne Road, Dublin, Ireland | Turkey | | 5–0 | Euro 1992 qualifying |
| 5 | 6 February 1991 | Racecourse Ground, Wrexham, Wales | Wales | | 3–0 | Friendly |
| 6 | 6 February 1991 | Racecourse Ground, Wrexham, Wales | Wales | | 3–0 | Friendly |
| 7 | 27 March 1991 | Wembley Stadium, London, England | England | | 1–1 | Euro 1992 qualifier |
| 8 | 29 April 1992 | Lansdowne Road, Dublin, Ireland | United States | | 4–1 | Friendly |
| 9 | 31 March 1993 | Lansdowne Road, Dublin, Ireland | Northern Ireland | | 3–0 | 1994 FIFA World Cup qualification |
| 10 | 28 April 1993 | Lansdowne Road, Dublin, Ireland | Denmark | | 1–1 | 1994 FIFA World Cup qualification |
| 11 | 12 October 1994 | Lansdowne Road, Dublin, Ireland | Liechtenstein | | 4–0 | UEFA Euro 1996 qualifying |
| 12 | 12 October 1994 | Lansdowne Road, Dublin, Ireland | Liechtenstein | | 4–0 | UEFA Euro 1996 qualifying |
| 13 | 29 March 1995 | Lansdowne Road, Dublin, Ireland | Northern Ireland | | 1–1 | UEFA Euro 1996 qualifying |
| 14 | 2 June 1996 | Lansdowne Road, Dublin, Ireland | Croatia | | 2–2 | Friendly |
| 15 | 31 August 1996 | Sportpark Eschen-Mauren, Eschen, Liechtenstein | Liechtenstein | | 5–0 | 1998 FIFA World Cup qualification |
| 16 | 31 August 1996 | Sportpark Eschen-Mauren, Eschen, Liechtenstein | Liechtenstein | | 5–0 | 1998 FIFA World Cup qualification |
| 17 | 14 October 1998 | Lansdowne Road, Dublin, Ireland | Malta | | 5–0 | UEFA Euro 2000 qualifying |
| 18 | 9 June 1999 | Lansdowne Road, Dublin, Ireland | Macedonia | | 1–0 | UEFA Euro 2000 qualifying |
| 19 | 9 October 1999 | Philip II Arena, Skopje, Macedonia | Macedonia | | 1–1 | UEFA Euro 2000 qualifying |
| 20 | 4 June 2000 | Giants Stadium, East Rutherford, South Africa | South Africa | | 2–1 | U.S. Cup |
| 21 | 6 October 2001 | Lansdowne Road, Dublin, Ireland | Cyprus | | 4–0 | 2002 FIFA World Cup qualification |

=== Managerial ===
| Team | Nat | From | To | Record | | | | |
| Team | Nat | From | To | G | W | L | D | Win % |
|---|---|---|---|---|---|---|---|---|
| Sunderland | (England) | 25 July 2006 | 30 August 2006 | 6 | 1 | 5 | 0 | 16.67 |

== Honours ==
Arsenal

- Football League Cup: 1986–87

Sunderland

- Football League First Division: 1998–99

Individual

- Irish Young Player of the Year: 1990
- Manchester City Player of the Year: 1991
- PFA Team of the Year: 1998–99 First Division
- Sunderland Player of the Year: 1999
- North East Football Writers' Player of 1999
- Beacon Fellowship Prize for his contribution to medical and children's charities, 2003
- PFA Merit Award: 2002
- North East Football Writers' Association's Personality of the Year: 2011
- Freedom of Sunderland award: 2013

== See also ==
- List of outfield association footballers who played in goal
- List of players who have converted from one football code to another
