= David Brightwell =

English footballer

Personal information
- Full name: David John Brightwell
- Date of birth: 7 January 1971 (age 55)
- Place of birth: Lutterworth, England
- Height: 6 ft 1 in (1.85 m)
- Position: Defender

Youth career
- Manchester City

Senior career*
Years	Team	Apps	(Gls)
1988–1995	Manchester City	43	(1)
1991	→ Chester City (loan)	6	(0)
1995	→ Lincoln City (loan)	5	(0)
1995	→ Stoke City (loan)	1	(0)
1995	→ Bradford City (loan)	1	(0)
1995–1997	Bradford City	23	(0)
1996–1997	→ Blackpool (loan)	2	(0)
1997–1998	Northampton Town	35	(1)
1998–2000	Carlisle United	78	(4)
2000–2001	Hull City	27	(2)
2001–2002	Darlington	36	(0)
Total		257	(8)
- * Club domestic league appearances and goals

David John Brightwell (born 7 January 1971) is an English former professional footballer who played as defender from 1988 to 2002.

He notably played Premier League football for Manchester City and went on to play in the Football League for Chester City, Lincoln City, Stoke City, Bradford City, Blackpool, Northampton Town, Carlisle United, Hull City and Darlington.

== Playing career ==
Brightwell played for ten professional clubs during his long career. He started at Manchester City, where he had been a trainee. He played 44 league games but also had loans spell at Chester City, Lincoln City, Stoke City and Bradford City.

He joined Bradford permanently in December 1995 for £30,000 and took part in their 1995–96 promotion season. He spent a period on loan at Blackpool before he signed on a free transfer for Northampton Town. He made further free transfers to Carlisle United and Hull City before signing for his final club Darlington in February 2001. Whilst at Carlisle, he played a part in one of the most dramatic footballing moments of all time. With Carlisle needing to beat Plymouth Argyle on the last day of the season to avoid relegation from the Football League, Brightwell equalised from 25 yards when they fell behind and this paved the way for Jimmy Glass, their goalkeeper, to score the winner in injury time.

Brightwell played a total of 258 league games during his career, scoring eight goals.

== Personal life ==
Brightwell was born in Lutterworth, England. He is the son of Olympic gold medalist Ann Packer and 400m runner Robbie Brightwell and brother of footballer Ian Brightwell. He now works as a fireman.

== Career statistics ==
Appearances and goals by club, season and competition
Club	Season	League			FA Cup		League Cup		Other^{[A]}		Total	
Club	Season	Division	Apps	Goals	Apps	Goals	Apps	Goals	Apps	Goals	Apps	Goals
Manchester City	1990–91	First Division	0	0	0	0	0	0	0	0	0	0
Manchester City	1991–92	First Division	4	0	0	0	0	0	0	0	4	0
Manchester City	1992–93	Premier League	8	0	2	0	0	0	0	0	10	0
Manchester City	1993–94	Premier League	22	1	1	0	1	0	0	0	24	1
Manchester City	1994–95	Premier League	9	0	4	1	2	0	0	0	15	1
Manchester City	1995–96	Premier League	0	0	0	0	0	0	0	0	0	0
Manchester City	Total		43	1	7	1	3	0	0	0	53	2
Chester City (loan)	1990–91	Third Division	6	0	0	0	0	0	0	0	6	0
Lincoln City (loan)	1995–96	Third Division	5	0	0	0	0	0	2	0	7	0
Stoke City (loan)	1995–96	First Division	1	0	0	0	0	0	1	0	2	0
Bradford City	1995–96	Second Division	22	0	1	0	0	0	2	0	25	0
Bradford City	1996–97	First Division	2	0	0	0	0	0	0	0	2	0
Bradford City	Total		24	0	1	0	0	0	2	0	27	0
Blackpool (loan)	1996–97	Second Division	2	0	0	0	0	0	0	0	2	0
Northampton Town	1997–98	Second Division	35	1	5	0	2	0	3	0	45	1
Carlisle United	1998–99	Third Division	41	4	1	0	2	0	1	0	45	4
Carlisle United	1999–2000	Third Division	37	0	1	0	2	0	2	0	42	0
Carlisle United	Total		78	4	2	0	4	0	3	0	87	4
Hull City	2000–01	Third Division	27	2	2	0	2	0	1	0	32	2
Darlington	2000–01	Third Division	14	0	0	0	0	0	0	0	14	0
Darlington	2001–02	Third Division	22	0	4	0	1	0	1	0	28	0
Darlington	Total		36	0	4	0	1	0	1	0	42	0
Career total			257	8	21	1	12	0	13	0	303	9

A. The "Other" column constitutes appearances and goals in the Anglo-Italian Cup, Football League Trophy.

== Honours ==
=== As a player ===
Manchester City

- Second Division runner-up: 1988–89
