= Tony Coton =

English footballer

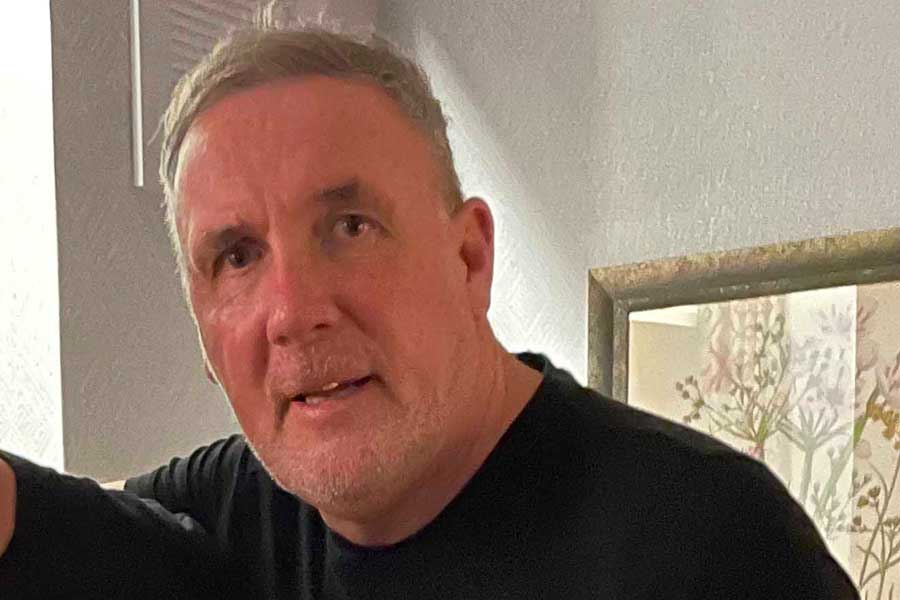
- Coton in June 2022

Personal information
- Full name: Anthony Philip Coton
- Date of birth: 19 May 1961 (age 65)
- Place of birth: Tamworth, England
- Height: 1.88 m (6 ft 2 in)
- Position: Goalkeeper

Team information
- Current team: Manchester United (goalkeeper scout)

Youth career
- Mile Oak Rovers
- Tamworth
- 1977–1978: Birmingham City

Senior career*
Years	Team	Apps	(Gls)
1978–1984	Birmingham City	94	(0)
1979	→ Hereford United (loan)	0	(0)
1984–1990	Watford	233	(0)
1990–1996	Manchester City	164	(0)
1996	Manchester United	0	(0)
1996–1997	Sunderland	10	(0)
Total		501	(0)

International career
1992	England B	1	(0)
- * Club domestic league appearances and goals

Anthony Philip Coton (born 19 May 1961) is an English football coach and former footballer who is a goalkeeper scout for Premier League side Manchester United.

As a player he was a goalkeeper who made 500 appearances in the Football League and Premier League for Birmingham City, Watford, Manchester City, Manchester United and Sunderland. During his career he was called up to the England team on one occasion in 1993 but didn't feature, with his only taste of international football being a cap for the England B team in 1992.

Following his retirement in 1997, Coton returned to Manchester United as the club's goalkeeping coach where he remained until an injury put an end to his ten-year coaching career, he has since spent time as a players' agent before working in scouting notably for Wigan Athletic, Bolton Wanderers and Aston Villa.

== Club career ==
=== Birmingham City ===
Coton started his professional career at Birmingham City in 1978, having signed from Mile Oak Rovers the previous year. He made his Football League debut as a 19-year-old, on 27 December 1980 in the First Division match against Sunderland. His first touch of the ball was to save a penalty awarded after 54 seconds. By the 1982–83 season he had established himself as Birmingham's first-choice goalkeeper and was named Player of the Year.

=== Watford ===
Birmingham were relegated from the First Division at the end of the following season, but Coton found his way back into the top flight with a transfer to Watford, for a sum of £300,000. He soon replaced Steve Sherwood in Watford's goal and at the end of his second full season at Vicarage Road he won the Hornets' Player of the Season and Display of the Season awards, the latter for a clean sheet against Liverpool. He remained with the club even after their relegation from the First Division in 1988. He went on to become Watford Player of the Season for an unprecedented third time in 1989–90. Coton later became the second player to be inducted into Watford's Hall of Fame, behind club legend Luther Blissett.

=== Manchester City ===
Before the start of the 1990–91 season, Coton was bought for just under £1 million by Manchester City manager Howard Kendall. At the time, he was one of the most expensive goalkeepers to be signed by any British club. He went on to win the City Player of the Year award in both the 1991–92 and 1993–94 seasons. They finished fifth in the First Division during his first two seasons at Maine Road and ninth in the Premier League's first season. However, they dipped to 16th in 1993–94 and 17th in 1994–95, although he remained first-choice goalkeeper under subsequent managers Peter Reid and Brian Horton.

=== Manchester United ===
Coton's time at Manchester City was cut short by injury in 1995, and the signing of Eike Immel. In January 1996, he moved across the city to Manchester United for £500,000, a record fee for a transfer between United and City, to be understudy to Peter Schmeichel. He never played a first team game for United and made the substitutes bench only once although during a time when only three substitutes could be named. In his short time at Old Trafford he was part of the squad that won the FA Cup and the Premier League title. In the summer he would transfer to Sunderland after just six months with United, for a fee of £600,000.

=== Sunderland ===
He made a few impressive performances for his new club (who had just been promoted to the Premier League as Division One champions) before breaking his leg in five places during a league match against Southampton. The injury marked the end of his playing career.

== International career ==
Coton was included in several England squads between 1991 and 1993 by manager Graham Taylor, but never took the field. He was a member of the party that toured Australasia in 1991, and was called up for a Euro 1992 qualifier against Turkey later that year. He was capped by England B in February 1992 in a 3–0 win against France B – David Seaman played the first half and Coton the second – but withdrew through injury from senior friendlies against Czechoslovakia in March and Hungary in May. He was long-listed for Euro 1992, but Chris Woods and Nigel Martyn made the squad and Seaman was named as reserve. Coton was called up as reserve goalkeeper for what proved to be Taylor's last match as England manager, the World Cup qualifier against San Marino, and Taylor's successor, Terry Venables, included him in an England training camp in April 1994, but again he withdrew through injury.

== Coaching career ==
From 1997 to 2007, Coton was goalkeeping coach at Manchester United. He was forced to step down from the position in December 2007 due to a knee injury that stopped him participating in training sessions. He had had two operations in four months to correct his ongoing knee problems, but after discussions with his surgeon and the Manchester United medical staff, they agreed that retirement was the best option. Coton remained at United until the end of his contract in June 2008, but with reduced coaching responsibilities.

He went on to become a player's agent.

Coton spent time as chief scout of Wigan Athletic in 2014, and also scouted for Bolton Wanderers, before joining Aston Villa in 2015 as goalkeeping scout. He then spent two years as their head of domestic scouting, before returning to Sunderland as head of recruitment in June 2018.

In 2020, Coton re-joined Manchester United as the club's goalkeeper scout.

== Honours ==
Individual

- PFA Team of the Year: 1988–89 Second Division, 1989–90 Second Division, 1991–92 First Division
- Birmingham City Player of the Year: 1982–83
- Watford Player of the Year: 1985–86, 1986–87, 1989–90
- Manchester City Player of the Year: 1993–94
