= Michel Vonk =

Dutch footballer and manager (born 1968)

Personal information
- Full name: Michel Vonk
- Date of birth: 28 October 1968 (age 58)
- Place of birth: Alkmaar, Netherlands
- Height: 6 ft 3 in (1.91 m)
- Position: Centre-back

Senior career*
| Years | Team | Apps | (Gls) |
| 1986–1991 | AZ | 111 | (8) |
| 1991–1992 | SVV Dordrecht | 51 | (1) |
| 1992–1995 | Manchester City | 91 | (3) |
| 1995 | → Oldham Athletic (loan) | 5 | (1) |
| 1995–1998 | Sheffield United | 37 | (2) |
| 1998–2001 | MVV | 47 | (0) |
| Total | | 342 | (15) |

Managerial career
- 2011–2013: Sparta Rotterdam
- 2014–2017: Telstar
- 2018–2021: Jong AZ
- * Club domestic league appearances and goals

Michel Vonk (born 28 October 1968) is a Dutch professional football manager and former player. As a player, he was a centre-back, notably playing in the Premier League for Manchester City.

Vonk also played in England for Oldham Athletic and Sheffield United, as well as also playing in his native Netherlands for AZ, SVV Dordrecht and MVV. Since 2011 he has managed several teams in Dutch football with stints at both Sparta Rotterdam, Telstar, and Jong AZ.

== Playing career ==
Vonk played as centre back and began his career in 1986 with AZ '67 for whom he played 111 times and scored 8 goals. He transferred to SVV Dordrecht in 1991 and played 51 times for the team scoring 1 goal. Then in 1992 he transferred to Manchester City where he enjoyed three successful seasons playing a total of 91 league games for the club, scoring 4 times. He had been brought in by then City manager Peter Reid costing £500,000. He formed a successful partnership with Keith Curle in the centre of the City defence. In 1995, he criticised then City manager Brian Horton in the News of the World which earned him a suspension and being fined 2 weeks wages.

Subsequent City manager Alan Ball sold the player to Oldham Athletic for £350,000, where he played 5 times and scored 1 goal. He was then transferred to Sheffield United where he played until 1998. He played 37 times for the Blades scoring twice. His time with the club was hampered by injuries. In 1998, he returned to the Netherlands and began playing for MVV. His injuries continued however and he was released by the club when they were relegated.

== Coaching career ==
After retiring from active football, Vonk became a youth coach for PSV. He successively served as assistant to Wiljan Vloet at Sparta Rotterdam for two seasons.

In April 2011 Vonk agreed to return at Sparta as head coach for the 2011–12 season under supervision of newly appointed technical director Wiljan Vloet, who accepted to return at the Rotterdam club after two seasons as trainer of NEC Nijmegen. He was fired after one season. In July 2014, he started working for Telstar.

He later worked as assistant manager of SC Heerenveen under Jurgen Streppel, but left the club in 2019 when his contract was not renewed.

Between 2018 and 2021, Vonk managed Jong AZ in the Eerste Divisie.
