= Peter Reid =

English footballer, manager, and pundit (born 1956)

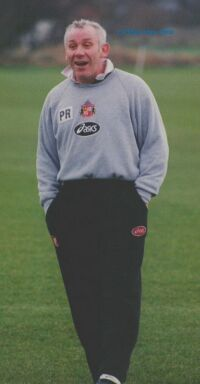
- Reid in 1998, during his tenure as manager of Sunderland

Personal information
- Full name: Peter Reid
- Date of birth: 20 June 1956 (age 70)
- Place of birth: Huyton, England
- Height: 5 ft 8 in (1.73 m)
- Position: Defensive midfielder

Youth career
- Huyton Boys
- Bolton Wanderers

Senior career*
Years	Team	Apps	(Gls)
1974–1982	Bolton Wanderers	225	(23)
1982–1989	Everton	159	(8)
1989	Queens Park Rangers	29	(1)
1989–1993	Manchester City	103	(1)
1993–1994	Southampton	7	(0)
1994	Notts County	5	(0)
1994–1995	Bury	1	(0)
Total		529	(33)

International career
1977–1978	England U21	6	(0)
1985–1988	England	13	(0)

Managerial career
- 1990–1993: Manchester City (player-manager)
- 1995–2002: Sunderland
- 1999: England U21
- 2003: Leeds United
- 2004–2005: Coventry City
- 2008–2009: Thailand
- 2010–2011: Plymouth Argyle
- 2014: Mumbai City
Medal record
Men's football
Representing Thailand (as manager)
AFF Championship
Runner-up	2008
- * Club domestic league appearances and goals

Peter Reid (born 20 June 1956) is an English football manager, pundit and former player.

A defensive midfielder in his playing days, Reid enjoyed a long and successful career. He built his reputation as one of England's brightest midfield talents of the time at Bolton Wanderers, before signing for Everton in 1982. It was there that he enjoyed the most fruitful spell of his career, as he helped the club win domestic and European honours, including the English Football League twice. He was voted as the PFA Players' Player of the Year in 1985 and came fourth in the World Soccer Player of the Year award, behind Michel Platini, Preben Elkjær and Diego Maradona. He also received his first senior England call-up that year, and represented his country at the 1986 FIFA World Cup and UEFA Euro 1988. He won 13 caps in total. Reid joined Queens Park Rangers in 1989, but moved on to Manchester City a year later to begin his managerial career.

He spent three years at Maine Road as player-manager, and guided them to two fifth-place finishes in the First Division, the first of which saw them finish above their city rivals Manchester United. He was persuaded to resume his playing career after leaving Manchester City, and briefly played for Southampton, Notts County and Bury before returning to management with Sunderland in 1995. He won promotion to the Premier League with the club on two occasions and achieved two seventh-place finishes in the top division. He combined his role at the Stadium of Light with the job as manager of the England U21 for a brief spell in 1999. His seven-year association with Sunderland ended in 2002 and he returned to management a year later, helping Leeds United avoid relegation from the Premier League. Reid left Elland Road the following season.

He was appointed manager of Coventry City in 2004 but his tenure lasted less than a year. He then worked as a pundit for the BBC at the 2006 FIFA World Cup, and also worked for Sky Sports and ESPN before returning to management with Thailand in 2008. He won the T&T Cup with the country before returning to England as assistant manager to Tony Pulis at Stoke City, and helped them to an eleventh-place finish in the Premier League. He then managed Plymouth Argyle, taking over in June 2010, but was sacked after just over a year at the Devon club.

== Playing career ==
=== Club career ===
Reid signed professional forms with Bolton Wanderers in 1974. He first won a medal when Bolton won the championship of the Football League Second Division in 1978, but he only enjoyed two seasons of First Division football before Bolton were relegated.

The boyhood Liverpool fan transferred to rivals Everton for £60,000 in 1982, only 12 months after a much larger fee had been mooted – a succession of injuries had cut the price.

At club level his greatest achievement was as part of the Everton team that in 1984 won the FA Cup, in 1985 and 1987 the Football League First Division and in 1985 the European Cup Winners' Cup. They nearly won a unique treble but lost 1–0 to Manchester United in the 1985 FA Cup final. In that game, Reid was recklessly challenged by Manchester United defender Kevin Moran who became the first player to be sent off in an FA Cup final.

He was voted PFA Footballer of the Year in 1985, the same year that he collected a Football League title and European Cup Winner's Cup winner's medal. Reid's form was so good that year, he came 4th in the World Soccer player of the year award behind only Michel Platini, Preben Elkjaer and Diego Maradona.

He made 167 appearances (eight as substitute) for Everton. In 2006, Reid was awarded with the 'Everton Giant' accolade.

Reid signed for Queens Park Rangers on a free transfer in February 1989, but only stayed until December, when he signed for Manchester City, then managed by former Everton manager Howard Kendall.

Following his dismissal by Manchester City, in October 1993 Reid was persuaded by Ian Branfoot to resume his playing career with Southampton who were then in the middle of a crisis: the Saints fans were calling for Branfoot to be sacked with the club having lost eight of their first nine games. Reid brought a touch of guile and stability to the Saints side; despite playing only eight games he made a major contribution to the team's fortunes as Saints' season started to come together. He led them to some important victories, most specially over Newcastle United on 24 October 1993, a game in which Matt Le Tissier scored two goals. His final game for Saints was a 3–1 victory over Chelsea on 28 December 1993.

Branfoot was sacked a few days later (after a home defeat by Norwich City). Reid was touted as a possible replacement for Branfoot, but he stated that, as Branfoot had brought him to the club, it would only be fair that he left as well. Reid then had brief playing spells with Notts County and Bury before he retired from playing.

=== International career ===
Reid won 13 caps for England. Given his chance by the injuries to other players, he became the linchpin of the England team in the 1986 FIFA World Cup in Mexico. In the England v Argentina quarter-final at that tournament Reid was one of the England players left behind by Diego Maradona as he burst from inside his own half to score his 'Goal of the Century' second goal.

== Managerial career ==
=== Manchester City ===
Reid's managerial career began on 7 November 1990 at Manchester City, when he was appointed caretaker manager after the departure of Howard Kendall back to Everton. Reid was appointed player-manager on a permanent contract on 15 November.

In 1990–91, Manchester City finished fifth (one place above neighbours Manchester United) and equalled this achievement the following season. In the first season of the Premier League (1992–93), City slipped into ninth place with an increasingly stale brand of 'long ball' football and Reid was sacked after a poor start to the following season.

Reid bought Keith Curle and Terry Phelan for £2.5 million each. Colin Hendry was sold to be eventually replaced by Michel Vonk. Clive Allen was also sold in December 1991.

=== Sunderland ===
Reid made his return to management in March 1995 with Sunderland, who were battling relegation in the First Division. He kept the club up, and the following season they were crowned champions of the division and were promoted to the Premier League.

In 1996, a group of Sunderland fans under the name Simply Red and White released a song called "Daydream Believer (Cheer Up Peter Reid)" to the melody of "Daydream Believer". The song peaked at number 41 in the UK Singles & Album Chart. The fans recorded the song due to the fact the manager often had a dour demeanour, whilst the team was doing well, and even won promotion at the end of the season.

The team was relegated back to the First Division at the end of the 1996–97 season, after losing their last match of the campaign at Wimbledon.

Sunderland missed automatic promotion by one place in 1997–98 but reached the Division One play-off final, facing Charlton Athletic at Wembley Stadium. Reid's side missed out on promotion after drawing 3-3 after 90 minutes, 4-4 after extra time and losing 7–6 in a penalty shoot-out in one of the most dramatic play-off finals to date. The following season Sunderland bounced back by winning the Division One title with a then record 105 League points total. They topped the First Division table from October until the end of the season and clinched promotion on 13 April 1999 with a 5–2 win over Bury.

Throughout 1999–2000, Sunderland were competing for a place in European competition but in the end missed out after finishing in seventh place, one of the highest finishes ever achieved by a Premier League team in the season after promotion. Striker Kevin Phillips was the highest league scorer in England and Europe with 30 goals in the Premier League, and therefore won the European Golden Shoe that season; he was the last Englishman to win the accolade until 2024, when Harry Kane claimed the award after his 36-goal Bundesliga campaign. Reid also had a brief spell as manager of the England under-21 team in this season. For a while in 2000–01, Sunderland were second in the league and it looked as though they would secure qualification for the UEFA Champions League, but their form dipped in the final stages of the season and again they finished seventh.

Reid's team suffered a downturn in the 2001–02 season ending up one place above the relegation zone and with just 28 goals from 38 games – fewer than any other team in the division. In a bid to halt the decline, Reid paid a club record £6.75million for Norwegian striker Tore André Flo from Rangers but was unsuccessful. Reid was dismissed in October 2002 after nearly eight years as Sunderland manager.

=== Leeds United ===
Following his sacking from Sunderland, Reid was linked with the Republic of Ireland managerial position. He had even planned to apply for an Irish passport through his Drumcondra family connections. In March 2003 he was appointed caretaker manager of Leeds United after the dismissal of Terry Venables. The Elland Road club had been hit by £80 million debts after their £100 million outlay on new players in the space of five seasons had failed to land them a trophy. Reid looked to be the man to reverse the decline, especially after a 6–1 away win over Charlton Athletic and a 3–2 away win over Arsenal which ended the opposition's title hopes. After keeping Leeds up, he was awarded the job on a permanent basis.

The club was still in a poor financial state, and Reid was forced to sell Harry Kewell and bring in cheaper signings from abroad as replacements. His new signings failed to gel and he was sacked in November 2003 after a 6–1 defeat against newly promoted Portsmouth. Although many of his signings left Leeds after the club was relegated, Kevin Blackwell, whom Reid had brought to Leeds as assistant manager, later went on to become manager in 2004.

=== Coventry City ===
Reid was appointed manager of First Division side Coventry City in May 2004 with the aim of getting the club promoted to the Premier League. His spell at Highfield Road lasted only eight months as he departed on 6 January 2005 with the club 20th in the Championship.

=== Thailand national team ===
After an absence from management of nearly four years Reid became manager of Thailand in September 2008, having been linked with the position earlier in the year. He signed a four-year contract with an aim of qualifying for the 2014 FIFA World Cup. He admitted to not knowing much about Thai football, and referring to his players by squad numbers rather than their Thai names. Reid said "I was surprised by the players' ability and I'm learning things about football I'd never have learnt in the Premier League. It's great for my football education. This is pure football and I love it."

Reid's first assignment as the new national coach of Thailand was to take part in the T&T Cup in Vietnam, a three-team round-robin tournament with hosts Vietnam and North Korea. Thailand beat North Korea in the first game of the tournament and then went on to draw with Vietnam to clinch the championship. On 9 September 2009, the Thailand Football Association (FAT) announced that Reid had left his position as manager; his contract was terminated by mutual consent after a year in charge.

=== Stoke City ===
After Reid left the Thailand job on 10 September 2009, Reid joined Stoke City as assistant manager to Tony Pulis. Reid spent the 2009–10 season at Stoke before leaving in June 2010 in order to return to management.

=== Plymouth Argyle ===
On 24 June 2010, Plymouth Argyle confirmed the appointment of Reid as manager. Reid endured an unexpectedly turbulent time with the Pilgrims who had just been relegated from the Football League Championship. The club was hit with two winding-up petitions from HMRC in November, and was forced to sell star players Bradley Wright-Phillips and Craig Noone in the January transfer window. Reid himself even auctioned off his FA Cup runners up medal and paid the club's heating bill at one point. Despite these efforts the club was docked 10 points for intention to enter administration in February 2011 and left Argyle bottom of League 1 with relegation seeming inevitable. The club's relegation to League 2 was confirmed on 2 May 2011 following a 3–1 defeat to Southampton, with the club finishing 23rd in League One.

Reid was forced to sign an almost entirely new team over the summer of 2011, with 10 players making their debut on the opening day in a 1–1 draw with Shrewsbury Town. However the club were unable to build on the Shrewsbury result and lost their following 8 league games, all whilst the club was still stuck in financial turmoil. On 18 September, Peter Reid was sacked by acting chairman Peter Ridsdale with the club bottom of the Football League with just one point. Despite having a win rate of just 26% during his time at the club, Reid remains popular amongst Plymouth Argyle supporters because of his generosity and commitment during troubled times.

=== Mumbai City FC ===
On 4 September 2014, Reid was appointed manager of Mumbai City FC ahead of the inaugural Indian Super League season.

=== Return to Bolton ===
On 18 March 2016, it was announced that Reid had returned to his first club Bolton Wanderers in a coaching capacity to assist interim manager Jimmy Phillips. He left at the end of the season.

== Politics ==
Reid is a supporter of the Labour Party, and a close friend of party leader and Prime Minister Andy Burnham, who is an Everton supporter. Reid attended Burnham's inaugural speech as Prime Minister.

== Career statistics ==
=== Club ===
Appearances and goals by club, season and competition
Club	Season	League			FA Cup		League Cup		Other		Total	
Club	Season	Division	Apps	Goals	Apps	Goals	Apps	Goals	Apps	Goals	Apps	Goals
Bolton Wanderers	1974–75	Second Division	27	0	2	0	0	0	0	0	29	0
Bolton Wanderers	1975–76	Second Division	42	2	6	1	1	0	0	0	49	3
Bolton Wanderers	1976–77	Second Division	42	5	1	0	9	1	4 (Note: Appearances in Anglo-Scottish Cup)	0	56	6
Bolton Wanderers	1977–78	Second Division	38	9	4	0	3	0	3	0	48	9
Bolton Wanderers	1978–79	First Division	14	0	0	0	1	0	2	0	17	0
Bolton Wanderers	1979–80	First Division	17	3	4	0	0	0	0	0	21	3
Bolton Wanderers	1980–81	Second Division	18	2	0	0	0	0	0	0	18	2
Bolton Wanderers	1981–82	Second Division	12	1	0	0	1	0	3 (Note: Appearances in Football League Group Cup)	0	16	1
Bolton Wanderers	1982–83	Second Division	15	1	4	0	0	0	0	0	19	1
Bolton Wanderers	Total		225	23	21	1	15	1	12	0	273	25
Everton	1982–83	First Division	7	0	3	0	0	0	0	0	10	0
Everton	1983–84	First Division	35	2	8	1	10	1	0	0	53	4
Everton	1984–85	First Division	36	2	7	1	4	0	10 (Note: Nine appearances and goal in European Cup Winners' Cup and one appearance in FA Charity Shield)	1	57	4
Everton	1985–86	First Division	15	1	5	0	0	0	2 (Note: One appearance in FA Charity Shield and one in Football League Super Cup)	0	22	1
Everton	1986–87	First Division	16	1	2	0	0	0	0	0	18	1
Everton	1987–88	First Division	32	1	8	1	6	0	1 (Note: Appearance in FA Charity Shield)	0	47	2
Everton	1988–89	First Division	18	1	2	0	5	0	2 (Note: One appearance in Full Members' Cup and one in Football League Centenary Trophy)	0	27	1
Everton	Total		159	8	35	3	25	1	15	1	234	13
Queens Park Rangers	1988–89	First Division	14	1	0	0	0	0	0	0	14	1
Queens Park Rangers	1989–90	First Division	15	0	0	0	3	0	0	0	18	0
Queens Park Rangers	Total		29	1	0	0	3	0	0	0	32	1
Manchester City	1989–90	First Division	18	1	3	0	0	0	0	0	21	1
Manchester City	1990–91	First Division	30	0	1	0	1	0	0	0	32	0
Manchester City	1991–92	First Division	31	0	1	1	1	0	0	0	33	1
Manchester City	1992–93	Premier League	20	0	2	0	2	0	0	0	24	0
Manchester City	1993–94	Premier League	4	0	0	0	0	0	0	0	4	0
Manchester City	Total		103	1	7	1	4	0	0	0	114	2
Southampton	1993–94	Premier League	7	0	0	0	1	0	0	0	8	0
Notts County	1993–94	First Division	5	0	0	0	0	0	0	0	5	0
Bury	1994–95	Third Division	1	0	0	0	0	0	1 (Note: Appearance in Football League Trophy)	0	2	0
Career total			529	33	63	5	48	2	28	1	668	41

=== International ===
Appearances and goals by national team and year
National team	Year	Apps	Goals
England	1985	4	0
England	1986	5	0
England	1987	3	0
England	1988	1	0
Total		13	0

== Managerial statistics ==
As of 5 November 2014

Team	From	To	Record				
Team	From	To	G	W	D	L	Win %
Manchester City	15 November 1990	26 August 1993	131	56	31	44	42.75
Sunderland	29 March 1995	7 October 2002	353	159	95	99	45.04
England U21	June 1999	June 1999	1	1	0	0	100.00
Leeds United	21 March 2003	10 November 2003	22	6	4	12	27.27
Coventry City	5 June 2004	6 January 2005	31	10	8	13	32.26
Thailand	2 September 2008	9 September 2009	17	9	4	4	52.94
Plymouth Argyle	24 June 2010	18 September 2011	61	16	9	36	26.23
Mumbai City	4 September 2014	20 December 2014	6	3	0	3	50.00
Total			622	260	151	211	41.80

== Honours ==
=== As a player ===
Bolton Wanderers

- Football League Second Division: 1977–78

Everton

- Football League First Division: 1984–85, 1986–87
- FA Cup: 1983–84; runner-up: 1984–85, 1985–86
- FA Charity Shield: 1984, 1985, 1987
- European Cup Winners' Cup: 1984–85
- Football League Cup runner-up: 1983–84

Individual

- PFA Players' Player of the Year: 1984–85
- PFA Team of the Year: 1987–88 First Division
- Greatest Everton XI: 2003
- Everton Giants: 2006

=== As a manager ===
Sunderland

- Football League First Division: 1995–96, 1998–99

Thailand

- VFF Cup: 2008; runner-up: 2008 AFF Suzuki Cup

Individual

- LMA Manager of the Year: 1996
- LMA Manager of the Month: December 2000
- Premier League Manager of the Month: October 1999, December 2000
- Football League First Division Manager of the Month: December 1997, March 1999
