= David White (English footballer) =

English footballer

Personal information
- Date of birth: 30 October 1967 (age 59)
- Place of birth: Urmston, Lancashire, England
- Height: 6 ft 1 in (1.85 m)
- Positions: Right winger; striker

Senior career*
Years	Team	Apps	(Gls)
1985–1993	Manchester City	286	(79)
1993–1995	Leeds United	42	(9)
1995–1998	Sheffield United	66	(13)
Total		394	(101)

International career
1988–1989	England U21	6	(2)
1991–1992	England B	2	(0)
1992	England	1	(0)
- * Club domestic league appearances and goals

David White (born 30 October 1967) is an English former professional footballer who played as a forward from 1985 to 1998.

He is best remembered for his eight-year spell at Manchester City, where he played in the inaugural Premier League season. He switched to Leeds United in 1993 before finishing his career in the Football League with a three-year spell at Sheffield United. He was capped once by England and had previously appeared at England U21 and England B team level.

== Playing career ==
=== Manchester City ===
In his childhood White played for Salford Boys, before joining the youth system at Manchester City. He signed as an apprentice on his eighteenth birthday, and was a member of City's "golden generation" that won the FA Youth Cup in 1986. White made his debut for Manchester City's first-team in September 1986, in a 1–0 defeat to Luton Town. He soon became a regular in the side, alternating between the right-wing and striker positions, and missed just one game in the next two seasons. On 7 November 1987 he was one of three players (along with Tony Adcock and Paul Stewart) to score a hat-trick in a 10–1 victory over Huddersfield Town.

He had been a first team regular in 1986–87, playing 24 games in the First Division and scoring once, though he could not prevent relegation to the Second Division. His 13 goals in 1987–88 were not enough for promotion, but this was achieved in 1988–89 when he scored six goals as City finished runners-up. White's best years were arguably in the early 1990s, when he was known for his pace and strength. He almost always played on the right wing in teams featuring two strikers, and was second top scorer for City in their first two seasons back in the First Division (eight goals in 1989–90 and 16 in 1990–91), and top scorer in the next two seasons. On 23 April 1991 he scored four times for City away to Aston Villa, becoming the first City player to score four goals in a league match since 1977. Shortly after he was capped at England "B" level.

As the top division became the Premier League in 1992 (White scored a personal best 18 goals in 1991–92 as City finished fifth for the second season running), White scored Manchester City's first goal in the Premier League after good build up play by Niall Quinn and Paul Lake. After seven goals in the first seven games of this season (1992–93) he made his full international debut.

=== Leeds United ===
In December 1993, White was signed by Leeds in an exchange for David Rocastle valued at £1.2 million. He left Maine Road having played 343 first-team games for City, scoring 96 goals (79 in the league). He was also the scorer of City's first Premier League goal, finding the net in the 37th minute at home to Queen's Park Rangers in a 1–1 draw.

White never really lived up to expectations at Elland Road. He suffered a succession of injuries and was restricted to just 10 goals for Leeds in his two years at the club.

=== Sheffield United ===
In November 1995, he was loaned to Sheffield United, and a month later he signed a permanent contract after the two clubs agreed a £500,000 fee.

At Bramall Lane, White showed flashes of his old self, that had made him a star at Manchester City a few years before, but he was still bothered by injuries. He continued to suffer problems with his arthritic right ankle, making his final appearance in a League Cup match against Wrexham in 1997, before having to admit defeat and retire from the game.

== International career ==
In 1987, he won several caps for the England Under-21 side. He made his full international debut in a friendly against Spain, but missed a chance to score early on and lost confidence. White received strong press criticism, and lost form in the aftermath.

== Personal life ==
After his retirement from the game he became managing director of his own recycling and waste management company "White Recycling". The company went into receivership in 2015.

In November 2016, White revealed that he had been a victim of sexual abuse by football coach Barry Bennell in the late 1970s and early 1980s, while playing for Whitehill F.C. junior team in Manchester.
