= 1995–96 Manchester City F.C. season =

English football club season

Manchester City F.C.
1995–96 season
- Chairman: David Bernstein
- Manager: Alan Ball
- Stadium: Maine Road
- FA Premier League: 18th (relegated)
- FA Cup: Fifth round
- League Cup: Third round
- Top goalscorer: League: Uwe Rösler (9); All: Uwe Rösler (13)
- Highest home attendance: 31,436 (vs. Liverpool, 5 May)
- Lowest home attendance: 23,617 (vs. Wimbledon, 22 November)
- Average home league attendance: 27,869 (10th highest in league)
Home colours	Away colours

During the 1995–96 English football season, Manchester City competed in the FA Premier League.

== Team kit ==
The team kit was produced by Umbro and the shirt sponsor was Brother.

The home kit, while on the face of it a classic plain blue shirt with white shorts, in fact had a pattern inlaid that was only visible when caught by the light, which contained an outer circle similar to the club badge at the time, with the word "City" in giant capital letters over the top. The away kit was intended as a tribute to the classic red and black stripes which City had worn as an away kit on a number of occasions previously, but for no apparent reason had two-tone grey shoulder stripes as well as an embossed shield which was more suited to the shape of the club's badge after its redesign in 1997 (by which point the shirt was no longer being worn) than the circular badge of the time.

Home
Away

== Season summary ==
When Alan Ball was named as Manchester City manager at the start of the new season, he said that his job was "the envy of millions". But it quickly appeared to be a poisoned chalice, as a City side in the middle of a major transition (with many older players being transferred to make way for the club's promising set of youngsters) failed to win any of their first 11 FA Premier League games. This was followed by four wins from their next five games, which lifted City out of the relegation zone.

A 2–2 home draw with third-placed Liverpool on the final day of the season looked to have secured City's survival, but positive results and a greater goal difference for the two sides directly above them - Coventry City and Southampton - condemned the club to relegation after seven years in the top flight.

== Final league table ==
Pos	Team	Pld	W	D	L	GF	GA	GD	Pts	Qualification or relegation
16	Coventry City	38	8	14	16	42	60	−18	38	
17	Southampton	38	9	11	18	34	52	−18	38	
18	Manchester City (R)	38	9	11	18	33	58	−25	38	Relegation to Football League First Division
19	Queens Park Rangers (R)	38	9	6	23	38	57	−19	33	Relegation to Football League First Division
20	Bolton Wanderers (R)	38	8	5	25	39	71	−32	29	Relegation to Football League First Division

Source: Premier League
Rules for classification: 1) points; 2) goal difference; 3) number of goals scored.
(R) Relegated

=== Results summary ===
Overall								Home						Away					
Pld	W	D	L	GF	GA	GD	Pts	W	D	L	GF	GA	GD	W	D	L	GF	GA	GD
38	9	11	18	33	58	−25	38	7	7	5	21	19	+2	2	4	13	12	39	−27

== Results ==
Manchester City's score comes first

=== Legend ===
Win	Draw	Loss

=== FA Premier League ===
Date	Opponent	Venue	Result	Attendance	Scorers
19 August 1995	Tottenham Hotspur	H	1–1	30,827	Rösler
23 August 1995	Coventry City	A	1–2	15,957	Rösler
26 August 1995	Queens Park Rangers	A	0–1	14,212	
30 August 1995	Everton	H	0–2	28,432	
10 September 1995	Arsenal	H	0–1	23,994	
16 September 1995	Newcastle United	A	1–3	36,501	Creaney
23 September 1995	Middlesbrough	H	0–1	25,865	
30 September 1995	Nottingham Forest	A	0–3	25,620	
14 October 1995	Manchester United	A	0–1	35,707	
21 October 1995	Leeds United	H	0–0	26,390	
28 October 1995	Liverpool	A	0–6	39,267	
4 November 1995	Bolton Wanderers	H	1–0	28,397	Summerbee
18 November 1995	Sheffield Wednesday	A	1–1	24,422	Lomas
22 November 1995	Wimbledon	H	1–0	23,617	Quinn
25 November 1995	Aston Villa	H	1–0	28,027	Kinkladze
2 December 1995	Leeds United	A	1–0	33,249	Creaney
9 December 1995	Middlesbrough	A	1–4	29,469	Kinkladze
18 December 1995	Nottingham Forest	H	1–1	25,660	Rösler
23 December 1995	Chelsea	H	0–1	28,668	
26 December 1995	Blackburn Rovers	A	0–2	28,915	
1 January 1996	West Ham United	H	2–1	26,024	Quinn (2)
13 January 1996	Tottenham Hotspur	A	0–1	31,438	
20 January 1996	Coventry City	H	1–1	25,710	Rösler
31 January 1996	Southampton	A	1–1	15,172	Rösler
3 February 1996	Queens Park Rangers	H	2–0	27,509	Clough, Symons
10 February 1996	Everton	A	0–2	37,354	
24 February 1996	Newcastle United	H	3–3	31,115	Quinn (2), Rösler
2 March 1996	Blackburn Rovers	H	1–1	29,078	Lomas
5 March 1996	Arsenal	A	1–3	34,519	Creaney
12 March 1996	Chelsea	A	1–1	17,078	Clough
16 March 1996	Southampton	H	2–1	29,550	Kinkladze (2)
23 March 1996	West Ham United	A	2–4	24,017	Quinn (2)
30 March 1996	Bolton Wanderers	A	1–1	21,050	Quinn
6 April 1996	Manchester United	H	2–3	29,688	Kavelashvili, Rösler
8 April 1996	Wimbledon	A	0–3	11,844	
13 April 1996	Sheffield Wednesday	H	1–0	30,898	Rösler
27 April 1996	Aston Villa	A	1–0	39,336	Lomas
5 May 1996	Liverpool	H	2–2	31,436	Rösler (pen), Symons

=== FA Cup ===
Round	Date	Opponent	Venue	Result	Attendance	Goalscorers
R3	6 January 1996	Leicester City	A	0–0	20,640	
R3R	17 January 1996	Leicester City	H	5–0	19,980	Rösler, Kinkladze, Quinn, Lomas, Creaney
R4	7 February 1996	Coventry City	A	2–2	18,709	Busst (own goal), Flitcroft
R4R	14 February 1996	Coventry City	H	2–1	22,419	Clough, Symons
R5	18 February 1996	Manchester United	A	1–2	42,692	Rösler

=== League Cup ===
Round	Date	Opponent	Venue	Result	Attendance	Goalscorers
R2 First Leg	19 September 1995	Wycombe Wanderers	A	0–0	7,443	
R2 Second Leg	4 October 1995	Wycombe Wanderers	H	4–0	11,474	Rösler (2), Quinn, Curle (pen)
R3	25 October 1995	Liverpool	A	0–4	29,394	

== Squad ==
Note: Flags indicate national team as defined under FIFA eligibility rules; some limited exceptions apply. Players may hold more than one non-FIFA nationality.

No.	Pos.	Nation	Player
2	DF	ENG	Richard Edghill
3	DF	GER	Michael Frontzeck
4	MF	NIR	Steve Lomas
5	DF	ENG	Keith Curle
6	DF	SUI	Giuseppe Mazzarelli (on loan from FC Zürich)
7	MF	GEO	Georgi Kinkladze
8	FW	SCO	Gerry Creaney
9	FW	IRL	Niall Quinn
11	MF	ENG	Peter Beagrie
12	DF	ENG	Ian Brightwell
13	GK	WAL	Martyn Margetson
14	DF	WAL	Kit Symons
15	DF	IRL	Alan Kernaghan
16	MF	ENG	Nicky Summerbee
17	MF	ENG	Michael Brown

No.	Pos.	Nation	Player
18	FW	ENG	Nigel Clough
19	MF	ENG	Martin Phillips
20	DF	ENG	Lee Crooks
21	GK	GER	Eike Immel
23	MF	SCO	David Kerr
24	DF	ENG	Scott Hiley (on loan from Birmingham City)
25	GK	WAL	Andy Dibble
26	MF	ENG	Scott Thomas
27	DF	ENG	Rae Ingram
28	FW	GER	Uwe Rösler
29	DF	ENG	John Foster
30	DF	ENG	Chris Beech
31	MF	WAL	Aled Rowlands
32	FW	GEO	Mikheil Kavelashvili

=== Sold during season ===
Note: Flags indicate national team as defined under FIFA eligibility rules; some limited exceptions apply. Players may hold more than one non-FIFA nationality.

No.	Pos.	Nation	Player
1	GK	ENG	Tony Coton (to Manchester United)
2	DF	ENG	Andy Hill (to Port Vale)
3	DF	IRL	Terry Phelan (to Chelsea)
3	MF	DEN	Ronnie Ekelund (on loan from Barcelona)
6	DF	NED	Michel Vonk (to Sheffield United)
8	FW	ENG	Paul Walsh (to Portsmouth)
10	MF	ENG	Garry Flitcroft (to Blackburn Rovers)

No.	Pos.	Nation	Player
14	FW	WAL	Carl Griffiths (to Portsmouth)
18	DF	ENG	David Brightwell (to Bradford City)
19	FW	JAM	Fitzroy Simpson (to Portsmouth)
24	FW	ENG	Adie Mike (to Stockport County)
31	MF	ENG	Paul Lake (retired)
32	DF	ALB	Eduard Abazaj (on loan from Benfica)

== Statistics ==
=== Starting 11 ===
Considering starts in all competitions

No.	Pos.	Nat.	Name	MS	Notes
21	GK	(Germany)	Eike Immel	41	
2	RB	(England)	Richard Edghill	16	Michael Brown has 16 starts
12	CB	(England)	Ian Brightwell	29	
5	CB	(England)	Keith Curle	35	
14	LB	(Wales)	Kit Symons	41	
16	RM	(England)	Nicky Summerbee	34	
10	CM	(England)	Garry Flitcroft	26	
4	CM	(Northern Ireland)	Steve Lomas	35	
7	LM	(Georgia (country))	Georgi Kinkladze	40	
9	CF	(Republic of Ireland)	Niall Quinn	27	
28	CF	(Germany)	Uwe Rösler	28	
