= 1994–95 Manchester City F.C. season =

English football club season

Manchester City
1994–95 season
- Chairman: Francis Lee
- Manager: Brian Horton
- Stadium: Maine Road
- Premier League: 17th
- FA Cup: Fifth round
- League Cup: Fifth round
- Top goalscorer: League: Rösler (15); All: Rösler (22)
- Highest home attendance: 28,915 vs Blackburn Rovers (26 Dec 1994, Premier League)
- Lowest home attendance: 11,545 vs Barnet (5 Oct 1994, League Cup)
- Average home league attendance: 22,725 (12th highest in league)
Home colours	Away colours	Third colours

The 1994–95 season was Manchester City's sixth consecutive season in the top tier of English football, and their third in the Premier League.

== Season summary ==
Manchester City endured another torrid season which saw them struggle. Their goalscoring rate improving dramatically from 36 to 53, but they slipped one place into 17th - though still enough to achieve survival. But it was too late to save manager Brian Horton's job and he was sacked to make way for Alan Ball of Southampton.

Key striker Niall Quinn recovered from a serious knee injury but failed to make an impact on City's dismal showing, though new German striker Uwe Rösler was among the Premiership's top target men with 15 league goals. His strike partner Paul Walsh was also a frequent goalscorer, with 12 Premiership strikes.

One of the things that gave City fans something to look forward to was the emergence of young players like Garry Flitcroft, Richard Edghill and Steve Lomas. The close season arrival of Georgian midfielder Georgi Kinkladze was another prospect which suggested that the dark clouds that had recently hung over Maine Road might not have cast too lengthy a shadow.

City's average attendance was significantly lower this season due to the redevelopment of the Kippax Stand, which was not complete until October 1995.

== Team kit ==
The team kit was produced by Umbro and the shirt sponsor was Brother.

True products of the nineties, the home and away kits used in the 1994–95 season were arguably over-designed. The home kit, while on the face of it a classic plain blue shirt with white shorts, in fact had a pattern inlaid in such a way as was only visible when caught by the light, which contained oversized angular Umbro diamonds over the top of each other across the front of the shirt. The away kit was intended as a tribute to the classic red and black stripes which City had worn as an away kit on a number of occasions previously, but for no apparent reason had two-tone grey shoulder stripes as well as an embossed shield which was more suited to the shape of the club's badge after its redesign in 1997 (by which point the shirt was no longer being worn) than the circular badge of the time. The third kit was a more simple white kit with dark blue pinstripes and matching shorts.

== Final league table ==
Pos	Team	Pld	W	D	L	GF	GA	GD	Pts	Qualification or relegation
15	Everton	42	11	17	14	44	51	−7	50	Qualification for the Cup Winners' Cup first round (Note: Everton qualified for the Cup Winners' Cup as FA Cup winners.)
16	Coventry City	42	12	14	16	44	62	−18	50	
17	Manchester City	42	12	13	17	53	64	−11	49	
18	Aston Villa	42	11	15	16	51	56	−5	48	
19	Crystal Palace (R)	42	11	12	19	34	49	−15	45	Relegation to Football League First Division (Note: The Premier League relegated 4 teams while the Football League First Division only promoted 2 teams due to the Premier League contracting from 22 teams to 20 teams for the following season.)

Source: Premier League
Rules for classification: 1) points; 2) goal difference; 3) number of goals scored.
(R) Relegated
Notes:

Results summary

Overall								Home						Away					
Pld	W	D	L	GF	GA	GD	Pts	W	D	L	GF	GA	GD	W	D	L	GF	GA	GD
42	12	13	17	53	64	−11	49	8	7	6	37	28	+9	4	6	11	16	36	−20

Source: Statto

Results by round

Round	1	2	3	4	5	6	7	8	9	10	11	12	13	14	15	16	17	18	19	20	21	22	23	24	25	26	27	28	29	30	31	32	33	34	35	36	37	38	39	40	41	42
Ground	A	H	H	A	H	A	H	A	H	A	H	A	H	A	A	H	A	H	A	H	A	H	A	H	H	A	H	H	H	A	H	A	H	A	A	A	H	A	H	A	A	H
Result	L	W	W	L	D	D	W	L	D	W	W	L	D	L	W	W	W	L	L	L	L	D	D	D	L	D	L	W	D	D	L	D	W	L	L	L	W	W	D	D	L	L
Position	21	10	5	9	9	10	7	11	11	8	7	9	9	11	8	7	6	6	8	10	11	11	11	11	14	13	14	13	15	14	16	16	12	13	16	16	11	12	13	13	13	17

Source: Statto.com
A = Away; H = Home; W = Win; D = Draw; L = Loss

== Results ==
Manchester City's score comes first

=== Legend ===
Win	Draw	Loss

=== FA Premier League ===
Date	Opponent	Venue	Result	Attendance	Scorers
20 August 1994	Arsenal	A	0–3	38,368	
24 August 1994	West Ham United	H	3–0	19,150	Walsh, Beagrie, Rösler
27 August 1994	Everton	H	4–0	19,867	Rösler (2), Walsh (2)
31 August 1994	Chelsea	A	0–3	21,740	
10 September 1994	Crystal Palace	H	1–1	19,971	Walsh
17 September 1994	Sheffield Wednesday	A	1–1	26,585	Walsh
24 September 1994	Norwich City	H	2–0	21,031	Quinn, Rösler
1 October 1994	Leeds United	A	0–2	30,938	
8 October 1994	Nottingham Forest	H	3–3	23,150	Quinn (2), Lomas
15 October 1994	Queens Park Rangers	A	2–1	13,631	Flitcroft, Walsh
22 October 1994	Tottenham Hotspur	H	5–2	25,473	Walsh (2), Quinn, Lomas, Flitcroft
29 October 1994	Coventry City	A	0–1	15,802	
5 November 1994	Southampton	H	3–3	21,589	Walsh (2), Beagrie
10 November 1994	Manchester United	A	0–5	43,738	
20 November 1994	Leicester City	A	1–0	19,006	Quinn
26 November 1994	Wimbledon	H	2–0	21,131	Flitcroft, Rösler
3 December 1994	Ipswich Town	A	2–1	13,574	Flitcroft, Rösler
12 December 1994	Arsenal	H	1–2	20,580	Simpson
17 December 1994	West Ham United	A	0–3	17,286	
26 December 1994	Blackburn Rovers	H	1–3	28,915	Quinn
28 December 1994	Liverpool	A	0–2	38,122	
31 December 1994	Aston Villa	H	2–2	22,513	Rösler (2)
2 January 1995	Newcastle United	A	0–0	34,437	
14 January 1995	Coventry City	H	0–0	20,232	
25 January 1995	Leicester City	H	0–1	21,007	
4 February 1995	Southampton	A	2–2	14,902	Kernaghan, Flitcroft
11 February 1995	Manchester United	H	0–3	26,368	
22 February 1995	Ipswich Town	H	2–0	21,430	Quinn, Rösler
25 February 1995	Leeds United	H	0–0	22,892	
4 March 1995	Norwich City	A	1–1	16,266	Simpson
8 March 1995	Chelsea	H	1–2	21,880	Gaudino
15 March 1995	Everton	A	1–1	28,485	Gaudino
18 March 1995	Sheffield Wednesday	H	3–2	23,355	Rösler (2), Walsh
21 March 1995	Wimbledon	A	0–2	5,268	
1 April 1995	Crystal Palace	A	1–2	13,451	Rösler
11 April 1995	Tottenham Hotspur	A	1–2	27,410	Rösler
14 April 1995	Liverpool	H	2–1	27,055	Summerbee, Gaudino
17 April 1995	Blackburn Rovers	A	3–2	27,851	Curle (pen), Rösler, Walsh
29 April 1995	Newcastle United	H	0–0	27,389	
3 May 1995	Aston Villa	A	1–1	30,133	Rösler
6 May 1995	Nottingham Forest	A	0–1	28,882	
14 May 1995	Queens Park Rangers	H	2–3	27,850	Quinn, Curle (pen)

=== FA Cup ===
Round	Date	Opponent	Venue	Result	Attendance	Goalscorers
R3	8 January 1995	Notts County	A	2–2	12,376	Beagrie, D. Brightwell
R3R	18 January 1995	Notts County	H	5–2	14,261	Rösler (4), Gaudino
R4	28 January 1995	Aston Villa	H	1–0	21,177	Walsh
R5	19 February 1995	Newcastle United	A	1–3	33,219	Rösler

=== League Cup ===
Round	Date	Opponent	Venue	Result	Attendance	Goalscorers
R2 1st Leg	20 September 1994	Barnet	A	0–1	3,120	
R2 2nd Leg	5 October 1994	Barnet	H	4–1	11,545	Quinn (2), Walsh, Summerbee
R3	25 October 1994	Queens Park Rangers	A	4–3	11,701	Summerbee, Curle (pen), Beagrie, Lomas
R4	30 November 1994	Newcastle United	H	1–1	25,162	Rösler
R4R	21 December 1994	Newcastle United	A	2–0	30,156	Rösler, Walsh
R5	11 January 1995	Crystal Palace	A	0–4	16,668	

== Squad ==
Note: Flags indicate national team as defined under FIFA eligibility rules; some limited exceptions apply. Players may hold more than one non-FIFA nationality.

No.	Pos.	Nation	Player
1	GK	ENG	Tony Coton
2	DF	ENG	Andy Hill
3	DF	IRL	Terry Phelan
4	MF	GER	Maurizio Gaudino (on loan from Eintracht Frankfurt)
5	DF	ENG	Keith Curle (captain)
6	DF	NED	Michel Vonk
8	FW	ENG	Paul Walsh
9	FW	IRL	Niall Quinn
10	MF	ENG	Garry Flitcroft
11	MF	ENG	Peter Beagrie
12	DF	ENG	Ian Brightwell
13	GK	WAL	Martyn Margetson
14	FW	WAL	Carl Griffiths
15	DF	IRL	Alan Kernaghan
16	MF	ENG	Nicky Summerbee
17	MF	ENG	Mike Quigley

No.	Pos.	Nation	Player
18	DF	ENG	David Brightwell
19	MF	JAM	Fitzroy Simpson
21	MF	NIR	Steve Lomas
22	DF	ENG	Richard Edghill
23	MF	SCO	David Kerr
24	FW	ENG	Adie Mike
25	GK	WAL	Andy Dibble
27	DF	ENG	Rae Ingram
28	FW	GER	Uwe Rösler
29	DF	ENG	John Foster
30	FW	ENG	Steve Finney
31	MF	ENG	Paul Lake
32	GK	ENG	Simon Tracey (on loan from Sheffield United)
33	GK	ENG	John Burridge
34	MF	ENG	Scott Thomas

=== Left club during season ===
Note: Flags indicate national team as defined under FIFA eligibility rules; some limited exceptions apply. Players may hold more than one non-FIFA nationality.

No. / Pos. / Nation / Player; 4 / MF / ENG / Steve McMahon (to Swindon Town)	No. / Pos. / Nation / Player; 26 / FW / ENG / Mike Sheron (to Norwich City)

=== Reserve squad ===
Note: Flags indicate national team as defined under FIFA eligibility rules; some limited exceptions apply. Players may hold more than one non-FIFA nationality.

No.	Pos.	Nation	Player
—	DF	ENG	Chris Beech
—	DF	ENG	Lee Crooks
—	MF	ENG	Michael Brown

No.	Pos.	Nation	Player
—	MF	NIR	Jim Whitley
—	FW	IRL	Ray Kelly

== Transfers ==
=== In ===
Date	Pos	Name	From	Fee
24 June 1994	MF	Nicky Summerbee	Swindon Town	£1,500,000
1 August 1994	FW	Ray Kelly	Athlone Town	£30,000
15 December 1994	GK	John Burridge	Falkirk	Free transfer

=== Out ===
Date	Pos	Name	To	Fee
12 August 1994	MF	David Rocastle	Chelsea	£1,250,000
26 August 1994	FW	Mike Sheron	Norwich City	£1,000,000
1 December 1994	MF	Steve McMahon	Swindon Town	Free transfer

Transfers in: ▼£1,530,000
Transfers out: ▲£2,250,000
Total spending: ▲£720,000

== Statistics ==
=== Starting 11 ===
Considering only Premier League starts

No.	Pos.	Nat.	Name	MS	Notes
1	GK	(England)	Tony Coton	21	
12	RB	(England)	Ian Brightwell	29	
5	CB	(England)	Keith Curle	31	
6	CB	(Netherlands)	Michel Vonk	19	
3	LB	(Republic of Ireland)	Terry Phelan	26	
16	RM	(England)	Nicky Summerbee	39	
10	CM	(England)	Garry Flitcroft	37	
21	CM	(Northern Ireland)	Steve Lomas	19	Niall Quinn has 24 starts
11	LM	(England)	Peter Beagrie	33	
8	CF	(England)	Paul Walsh	39	
28	CF	(Germany)	Uwe Rösler	28	
