= 1993–94 Manchester City F.C. season =

English football club season

Manchester City
1993–94 season
- Chairman: Peter Swales (until February); Francis Lee (from February)
- Manager: Peter Reid (player-manager); Brian Horton
- Stadium: Maine Road
- Premier League: 16th
- FA Cup: Fourth round
- League Cup: Fourth round
- Top goalscorer: League: Sheron (6); All: Sheron/Quinn (6)
- Highest home attendance: 35,155 vs Manchester United; 7 November 1993
- Lowest home attendance: 9,280 vs Reading; 22 September 1993
- Average home league attendance: 26,709 (9th highest in league)
| Home colours | Away colours | Third colours |

The 1993–94 season was Manchester City's fifth consecutive season in the top tier of English football, and their second in the Premier League.

== Season summary ==
Manchester City sacked manager Peter Reid just four games into the season, and quickly confirmed Brian Horton of Oxford United as his replacement.

City were a competitive, attacking side during Reid's three seasons as manager, when they finished fifth in his first two seasons and ninth in the next campaign. But under Horton, they found it increasingly difficult to find the net - just 36 goals were scored in the league all season, and no player scored more than 6 goals. The mid-season sale of David White to Leeds United robbed them of one of their last quality performers, and his replacement David Rocastle (signed from Leeds in a separate deal) failed to live up to expectations.

Despite their lack of goals, City avoided the drop and finished 16th - their lowest finish since relegation in 1987. Horton sought to reverse this decline by bringing in Nicky Summerbee, Uwe Rösler and Paul Walsh, while David Rocastle moved to Chelsea after less than a year at Maine Road.

== Kit ==
City introduced a home and third kit for the season, opting to retain the away kit following the traditional pattern of only replacing home and away kits in alternating seasons. The new home kit featured another pseudo-holographic pattern, this time of large Umbro diamonds from the chest to the left shoulder. The third kit simply adopted the away shirt's pinstripes but altered the colours to deep navy blue on white background. Umbro and Brother remained the kit manufacturers and sponsors respectively.

For this season, City never played in a Centenary shirt to celebrate the 100th anniversary of the club adopting the name Manchester City. The kit featured very thin pinstripe diagonal lines instead of the Umbro diamonds of the main shirt, and replaced the club badge with the coat of arms of the city of Manchester itself, ensconced in a laurel wreath and featuring a motto which simply read the club's name and the years of the centenary, the centenary crest was designed by former souvenir shop owner Eddie Phillips and his son Michael Phillips.

| Home | Centenary | Away | Third |

== Final league table ==
| Pos | Team | Pld | W | D | L | GF | GA | GD | Pts | Qualification or relegation |
|---|---|---|---|---|---|---|---|---|---|---|
| 14 | Chelsea | 42 | 13 | 12 | 17 | 49 | 53 | −4 | 51 | Qualification for the Cup Winners' Cup first round (Note: Chelsea qualified for the Cup Winners' Cup as FA Cup runners-up, as winners Manchester United qualified for the Champions League.) |
| 15 | Tottenham Hotspur | 42 | 11 | 12 | 19 | 54 | 59 | −5 | 45 | |
| 16 | Manchester City | 42 | 9 | 18 | 15 | 38 | 49 | −11 | 45 | |
| 17 | Everton | 42 | 12 | 8 | 22 | 42 | 63 | −21 | 44 | |
| 18 | Southampton | 42 | 12 | 7 | 23 | 49 | 66 | −17 | 43 | |

Source: Premier League
Rules for classification: 1) points; 2) goal difference; 3) number of goals scored.

=== Results summary ===
| Overall | | | | | | | | Home | | | | | | Away | | | | | |
| Pld | W | D | L | GF | GA | GD | Pts | W | D | L | GF | GA | GD | W | D | L | GF | GA | GD |
|---|---|---|---|---|---|---|---|---|---|---|---|---|---|---|---|---|---|---|---|
| 42 | 9 | 17 | 16 | 37 | 49 | −12 | 44 | 6 | 9 | 6 | 23 | 22 | +1 | 3 | 8 | 10 | 14 | 27 | −13 |

== Results ==
Manchester City's score comes first

=== Legend ===
| Win | Draw | Loss |

=== FA Premier League ===
| Date | Opponent | Venue | Result | Attendance | Scorers |
|---|---|---|---|---|---|
| 14 August 1993 | Leeds United | H | 1–1 | 32,366 | Flitcroft |
| 17 August 1993 | Everton | A | 0–1 | 26,036 | |
| 21 August 1993 | Tottenham Hotspur | A | 0–1 | 24,535 | |
| 24 August 1993 | Blackburn Rovers | H | 0–2 | 25,185 | |
| 27 August 1993 | Coventry City | H | 1–1 | 21,537 | Sheron |
| 1 September 1993 | Swindon Town | A | 3–1 | 14,300 | Vonk, Mike, Quinn |
| 11 September 1993 | Queens Park Rangers | H | 3–0 | 24,445 | Quinn, Sheron, Flitcroft |
| 20 September 1993 | Wimbledon | A | 0–1 | 8,481 | |
| 25 September 1993 | Sheffield United | A | 1–0 | 20,067 | Sheron |
| 4 October 1993 | Oldham Athletic | H | 1–1 | 21,401 | Sheron |
| 16 October 1993 | Arsenal | A | 0–0 | 29,567 | |
| 23 October 1993 | Liverpool | H | 1–1 | 30,403 | White |
| 1 November 1993 | West Ham United | A | 1–3 | 16,605 | Curle |
| 7 November 1993 | Manchester United | H | 2–3 | 35,155 | Quinn (2) |
| 20 November 1993 | Norwich City | A | 1–1 | 16,626 | Quinn |
| 22 November 1993 | Chelsea | A | 0–0 | 10,128 | |
| 27 November 1993 | Sheffield Wednesday | H | 1–3 | 23,416 | Sheron |
| 4 December 1993 | Leeds United | A | 2–3 | 33,821 | Griffiths, Sheron |
| 8 December 1993 | Everton | H | 1–0 | 20,513 | Griffiths |
| 11 December 1993 | Tottenham Hotspur | H | 0–2 | 21,566 | |
| 18 December 1993 | Blackburn Rovers | A | 0–2 | 18,741 | |
| 28 December 1993 | Southampton | H | 1–1 | 24,712 | Phelan |
| 1 January 1994 | Newcastle United | A | 0–2 | 35,585 | |
| 15 January 1994 | Arsenal | H | 0–0 | 25,642 | |
| 22 January 1994 | Liverpool | A | 1–2 | 41,872 | Griffiths |
| 5 February 1994 | Ipswich Town | H | 2–1 | 28,188 | Griffiths, Flitcroft |
| 12 February 1994 | West Ham United | H | 0–0 | 29,118 | |
| 19 February 1994 | Coventry City | A | 0–4 | 11,735 | |
| 22 February 1994 | Aston Villa | A | 0–0 | 19,254 | |
| 26 February 1994 | Swindon Town | H | 2–1 | 26,360 | Rocastle, Horlock (own goal) |
| 5 March 1994 | Queens Park Rangers | A | 1–1 | 13,474 | Rocastle |
| 12 March 1994 | Wimbledon | H | 0–1 | 23,981 | |
| 19 March 1994 | Sheffield United | H | 0–0 | 25,448 | |
| 26 March 1994 | Oldham Athletic | A | 0–0 | 16,464 | |
| 29 March 1994 | Ipswich Town | A | 2–2 | 13,099 | Rösler, Walsh |
| 2 April 1994 | Aston Villa | H | 3–0 | 26,075 | Beagrie, Walsh, Rösler |
| 4 April 1994 | Southampton | A | 1–0 | 16,377 | Karl |
| 9 April 1994 | Newcastle United | H | 2–1 | 33,774 | Walsh, D Brightwell |
| 16 April 1994 | Norwich City | H | 1–1 | 28,010 | Rösler |
| 23 April 1994 | Manchester United | A | 0–2 | 44,333 | |
| 30 April 1994 | Chelsea | H | 2–2 | 33,594 | Rösler, Walsh |
| 7 May 1994 | Sheffield Wednesday | A | 1–1 | 33,733 | Rösler |

=== FA Cup ===
| Round | Date | Opponent | Venue | Result | Attendance | Goalscorers |
|---|---|---|---|---|---|---|
| R3 | 8 January 1994 | Leicester City | H | 4–1 | 22,613 | Ingebrigtsen (3), Kernaghan |
| R4 | 29 January 1994 | Cardiff City | A | 0–1 | 20,486 | |

=== League Cup ===
| Round | Date | Opponent | Venue | Result | Attendance | Goalscorers |
|---|---|---|---|---|---|---|
| R2 1st leg | 22 September 1993 | Reading | H | 1–1 | 9,280 | White |
| R2 2nd leg | 6 October 1993 | Reading | A | 2–1 (won 3–2 on agg) | 10,052 | Lomas, Quinn |
| R3 | 26 October 1993 | Chelsea | H | 1–0 | 16,713 | White |
| R4 | 1 December 1993 | Nottingham Forest | A | 0–0 | 22,195 | |
| R4R | 15 December 1993 | Nottingham Forest | H | 1–2 | 14,117 | |

== Squad ==
Note: Flags indicate national team as defined under FIFA eligibility rules; some limited exceptions apply. Players may hold more than one non-FIFA nationality.

| No. | Pos. | Nation | Player |
|---|---|---|---|
| 1 | GK | ENG | Tony Coton |
| 2 | DF | ENG | Andy Hill |
| 3 | DF | IRL | Terry Phelan |
| 4 | MF | ENG | Steve McMahon |
| 5 | DF | ENG | Keith Curle (captain) |
| 6 | DF | NED | Michel Vonk |
| 7 | MF | ENG | David Rocastle |
| 8 | FW | ENG | Mike Sheron |
| 9 | FW | IRL | Niall Quinn |
| 10 | MF | ENG | Garry Flitcroft |
| 11 | FW | WAL | Carl Griffiths |
| 12 | DF | ENG | Ian Brightwell |
| 13 | GK | WAL | Martyn Margetson |
| 14 | MF | ENG | Paul Lake |
| 15 | DF | IRL | Alan Kernaghan |
| 16 | FW | ENG | Steve Finney |

| No. | Pos. | Nation | Player |
|---|---|---|---|
| 17 | MF | ENG | Mike Quigley |
| 18 | DF | ENG | David Brightwell |
| 19 | MF | JAM | Fitzroy Simpson |
| 20 | MF | NED | Alfons Groenendijk |
| 21 | MF | NIR | Steve Lomas |
| 22 | DF | ENG | Richard Edghill |
| 23 | MF | SCO | David Kerr |
| 24 | FW | ENG | Adie Mike |
| 25 | GK | WAL | Andy Dibble |
| 26 | MF | NOR | Kåre Ingebrigtsen |
| 27 | DF | ENG | Rae Ingram |
| 28 | FW | GER | Uwe Rösler |
| 29 | DF | ENG | John Foster |
| 30 | FW | ENG | Paul Walsh |
| 31 | MF | GER | Steffen Karl (on loan from Borussia Dortmund) |
| 32 | MF | ENG | Peter Beagrie |

=== Out on loan during season ===
Note: Flags indicate national team as defined under FIFA eligibility rules; some limited exceptions apply. Players may hold more than one non-FIFA nationality.

| No. | Pos. | Nation | Player |
|---|---|---|---|
| 26 | MF | NOR | Kåre Ingebrigtsen (to Rosenborg until October 1993) |

=== Left club during season ===
Note: Flags indicate national team as defined under FIFA eligibility rules; some limited exceptions apply. Players may hold more than one non-FIFA nationality.

| No. | Pos. | Nation | Player |
|---|---|---|---|
| 7 | FW | ENG | David White (to Leeds United) |
| 11 | MF | ENG | Rick Holden (to Oldham Athletic) |

| No. | Pos. | Nation | Player |
|---|---|---|---|
| 16 | MF | ENG | Peter Reid (player-manager; to Southampton) |
| 28 | MF | ENG | Carl Shutt (on loan from Birmingham City) |
