= 1996–97 Manchester City F.C. season =

English football club season

Manchester City
1996–97 season
- Chairman: (England) Francis Lee
- Manager: (England) Alan Ball, Jr. (until August) (England) Steve Coppell (from October to November) (England) Frank Clark (from December)
- Stadium: Maine Road
- First Division: 14th
- FA Cup: Fifth round
- League Cup: Second round
- Top goalscorer: League: Rösler (15); All: Uwe Rösler (17)
- Highest home attendance: 30,729 vs. Oldham Athletic (8 March 1997)
- Lowest home attendance: 23,079 vs. Oxford United (13 November 1996)
- Average home league attendance: 26,753
Home colours	Away colours

During the 1996–97 English football season, Manchester City F.C. competed in the Football League First Division.

== Team kit ==
Home
Away

== Season summary ==
Alan Ball was sacked soon after Manchester City's 1996–97 Division One campaign got underway. Despite decent form under caretaker manager Asa Hartford, the board opted to appoint former Crystal Palace manager Steve Coppell as Ball's successor, only for him to resign after just 6 matches in charge and 33 days as manager, claiming that the job was too much pressure for him. Phil Neal took over on a caretaker basis for 10 games; however he lost 7 of these and by Christmas, City were in the bottom half of Division One and had turned to former Nottingham Forest manager Frank Clark to arrest the decline. Manchester City finished 14th in the final table, making this the only season between 1995–96 and 2001–02 in which the club were not either promoted or relegated.

== Final league table ==
Pos	Team	Pld	W	D	L	GF	GA	GD	Pts
12	Stoke City	46	18	10	18	51	57	−6	64
13	Norwich City	46	17	12	17	63	68	−5	63
14	Manchester City	46	17	10	19	59	60	−1	61
15	Charlton Athletic	46	16	11	19	52	66	−14	59
16	West Bromwich Albion	46	14	15	17	68	72	−4	57

Rules for classification: 1) Points; 2) Goals scored; 3) Goal difference

=== Results summary ===
Overall								Home						Away					
Pld	W	D	L	GF	GA	GD	Pts	W	D	L	GF	GA	GD	W	D	L	GF	GA	GD
46	17	10	19	59	60	−1	61	12	4	7	34	25	+9	5	6	12	25	35	−10

== Results ==
Manchester City's score comes first

=== Legend ===
Win	Draw	Loss

=== Football League First Division ===
Date	Opponent	Venue	Result	Attendance	Scorers
16 August 1996	Ipswich Town	H	1–0	29,126	Lomas
20 August 1996	Bolton Wanderers	A	0–1	18,257	
24 August 1996	Stoke City	A	1–2	21,116	Rösler
3 September 1996	Charlton Athletic	H	2–1	25,963	Rösler (pen), Creaney
7 September 1996	Barnsley	H	1–2	26,464	Clough
10 September 1996	Port Vale	A	2–0	10,770	Rösler, Dickov
14 September 1996	Crystal Palace	A	1–3	17,638	Kavelashvili
21 September 1996	Birmingham City	H	1–0	26,757	Kinkladze (pen)
28 September 1996	Sheffield United	A	0–2	20,867	
12 October 1996	Queens Park Rangers	A	2–2	16,265	Brightwell, Kinkladze (pen)
15 October 1996	Reading	A	0–2	11,724	
19 October 1996	Norwich City	H	2–1	28,269	Clough, Dickov
27 October 1996	Wolverhampton Wanderers	H	0–1	27,296	
29 October 1996	Southend United	A	3–2	8,707	Rösler, Kinkladze (2, 1 pen)
2 November 1996	Swindon Town	A	0–2	14,374	
13 November 1996	Oxford United	H	2–3	23,079	Dickov, Brightwell
16 November 1996	Portsmouth	A	1–2	12,841	Rodger
19 November 1996	Huddersfield Town	H	0–0	23,314	
23 November 1996	Tranmere Rovers	H	1–2	26,531	Summerbee
27 November 1996	West Bromwich Albion	H	3–2	24,200	Rösler, Kinkladze (2 pens)
1 December 1996	Wolverhampton Wanderers	A	0–3	23,911	
7 December 1996	Bradford City	H	3–2	25,035	Kinkladze (pen), Dickov, Whitley
21 December 1996	Oldham Athletic	A	1–2	12,992	Kinkladze
26 December 1996	Port Vale	H	0–1	30,344	
28 December 1996	Barnsley	A	0–2	17,159	
11 January 1997	Crystal Palace	H	1–1	27,395	Tuttle (own goal)
18 January 1997	Huddersfield Town	A	1–1	18,358	Lomas
29 January 1997	Sheffield United	H	0–0	26,551	
2 February 1997	Oxford United	A	4–1	8,824	Gilchrist (own goal), Kinkladze (2), Rösler
8 February 1997	Southend United	H	3–0	26,261	Rösler (2), Kinkladze
22 February 1997	Swindon Town	H	3–0	27,262	Horlock, Summerbee, Rösler
1 March 1997	Bradford City	A	3–1	17,609	Rösler (2, 1 pen), Horlock
5 March 1997	Portsmouth	H	1–1	26,051	Horlock
8 March 1997	Oldham Athletic	H	1–0	30,729	Rösler
11 March 1997	Birmingham City	A	0–2	20,084	
15 March 1997	Grimsby Town	A	1–1	8,732	Kavelashvili
18 March 1997	Tranmere Rovers	A	1–1	12,019	O'Brien (own goal)
22 March 1997	Stoke City	H	2–0	28,497	Atkinson, Lomas
5 April 1997	Charlton Athletic	A	1–1	15,000	Brannan
9 April 1997	Bolton Wanderers	H	1–2	28,026	Kinkladze
12 April 1997	West Bromwich Albion	A	3–1	20,087	Rösler (2), Horlock
16 April 1997	Grimsby Town	H	3–1	23,334	Atkinson, Summerbee (2)
19 April 1997	Queens Park Rangers	H	0–3	27,580	
22 April 1997	Ipswich Town	A	0–1	15,824	
25 April 1997	Norwich City	A	0–0	14,080	
3 May 1997	Reading	H	3–2	27,260	Dickov, Rösler, Heaney

=== FA Cup ===
Round	Date	Opponent	Venue	Result	Attendance	Goalscorers
R3	25 January 1997	Brentford	A	1–0	12,019	Summerbee
R4	5 February 1997	Watford	H	3–1	24,031	Heaney, Summerbee, Rösler
R5	15 February 1997	Middlesbrough	H	0–1	30,462	

=== League Cup ===
Round	Date	Opponent	Venue	Result	Attendance	Goalscorers
R2 First Leg	17 September 1996	Lincoln City	A	1–4	7,599	Rösler
R2 Second Leg	24 September 1996	Lincoln City	H	0–1	14,242	

== Squad ==
Note: Flags indicate national team as defined under FIFA eligibility rules; some limited exceptions apply. Players may hold more than one non-FIFA nationality.

No.	Pos.	Nation	Player
—	GK	WAL	Andy Dibble
—	GK	WAL	Martyn Margetson
—	GK	NIR	Tommy Wright (on loan from Nottingham Forest)
—	GK	GER	Eike Immel
—	DF	ENG	Paul Beesley
—	DF	ENG	Ian Brightwell
—	DF	ENG	Lee Crooks
—	DF	ENG	Richard Edghill
—	DF	ENG	John Foster
—	DF	ENG	Scott Hiley
—	DF	ENG	Rae Ingram
—	DF	ENG	Darren Wassall (on loan from Derby County)
—	DF	WAL	Kit Symons
—	DF	IRL	Alan Kernaghan
—	DF	GER	Michael Frontzeck
—	MF	ENG	Peter Beagrie
—	MF	ENG	Ged Brannan
—	MF	ENG	Michael Brown

No.	Pos.	Nation	Player
—	MF	ENG	Neil Heaney
—	MF	ENG	Martin Phillips
—	MF	ENG	Simon Rodger (on loan from Crystal Palace)
—	MF	ENG	Nicky Summerbee
—	MF	NIR	Kevin Horlock
—	MF	NIR	Steve Lomas
—	MF	NIR	Jeff Whitley
—	MF	IRL	Eddie McGoldrick
—	MF	GEO	Georgi Kinkladze
—	FW	ENG	Dalian Atkinson (on loan from Fenerbahçe)
—	FW	ENG	Nigel Clough
—	FW	ENG	Chris Greenacre
—	FW	SCO	Gerry Creaney
—	FW	SCO	Paul Dickov
—	FW	IRL	Niall Quinn
—	FW	GER	Uwe Rösler
—	FW	GEO	Mikhail Kavelashvili
