= 1999–2000 Macclesfield Town F.C. season =

Macclesfield Town
1999–2000 season
- Stadium: Moss Rose
- Football League Third Division: 13th
- FA Cup: First round
- League Cup: Second round
- League Trophy: First round
- Top goalscorer: League: Richard Barker (16); All: Richard Barker (17)
- Highest home attendance: 3,456 vs Chester City, Third Division, 22 April 2000
- Lowest home attendance: 1,541 vs Mansfield Town, Third Division, 2 November 1999
- Biggest win: 3–0, 4–1, 5–2
- Biggest defeat: 0–4
Home colours

During the 1999–2000 English football season, Macclesfield Town Football Club competed in the Football League Third Division where they finished in 13th position on 65 points.

== Final league table ==
Pos	Team	Pld	W	D	L	GF	GA	GD	Pts
11	Brighton & Hove Albion	46	17	16	13	64	46	+18	67
12	Plymouth Argyle	46	16	18	12	55	51	+4	66
13	Macclesfield Town	46	18	11	17	66	61	+5	65
14	Hull City	46	15	14	17	43	43	0	59
15	Lincoln City	46	15	14	17	67	69	−2	59

Rules for classification: 1) Points; 2) Goal difference; 3) Goals scored

== Results ==
Macclesfield Town's score comes first

=== Legend ===
Win	Draw	Loss

=== Football League Division Three ===
Match	Date	Opponent	Venue	Result	Attendance	Scorers
1	7 August 1999	Northampton Town	H	1–0	2,694	Barker 57'
2	14 August 1999	Darlington	A	0–3	5,117	
3	21 August 1999	Swansea City	A	1–2	2,121	Askey 90'
4	28 August 1999	Hull City	A	3–2	6,222	Rioch 39', 55', Ware 88'
5	30 August 1999	Rotherham United	H	1–1	2,307	Barker 4'
6	5 September 1999	Barnet	A	1–2	2,426	Barker 70'
7	11 September 1999	Southend United	H	1–2	2,059	Barker 45'
8	18 September 1999	Lincoln City	A	1–1	2,918	Barker 58'
9	25 September 1999	Exeter City	A	3–0	3,202	Barker 9', Rioch 15', Durkan 45'
10	2 October 1999	Torquay United	H	1–2	2,002	Collins 22'
11	9 October 1999	Halifax Town	H	0–2	2,185	
12	16 October 1999	Chester City	A	2–1	2,506	Collins 8', Barker 30'
13	19 October 1999	Rochdale	A	1–0	2,397	Askey 5'
14	23 October 1999	Exeter City	H	1–0	1,893	Barker 25'
15	2 November 1999	Mansfield Town	H	5–2	1,541	Priest 8', Barker 10', 17', Sedgemore 82', Askey 86'
16	6 November 1999	York City	A	2–0	2,469	Sertori 33' (o.g.), Barker 82'
17	14 November 1999	Brighton & Hove Albion	H	1–1	2,920	Askey 64'
18	20 November 1999	Peterborough United	A	2–2	5,083	Askey 33', Barker 64'
19	27 November 1999	Hartlepool United	H	3–3	2,351	Priest 5', Barker 28', Askey 67'
20	4 December 1999	Northampton Town	A	0–2	5,355	
21	11 December 1999	Cheltenham Town	A	1–1	3,107	Durkan 52'
22	18 December 1999	Leyton Orient	H	1–0	2,303	Davies 58'
23	26 December 1999	Shrewsbury Town	A	1–0	4,302	Durkan 44'
24	28 December 1999	Carlisle United	H	2–1	2,836	Priest 82', 90'
25	3 January 2000	Plymouth Argyle	A	2–3	6,128	Askey 13', Wood 53'
26	8 January 2000	Cheltenham Town	H	1–2	3,221	Rioch 68' (pen)
27	15 January 2000	Darlington	H	1–2	2,399	Moore 14', Askey 34'
28	22 January 2000	Swansea City	A	0–1	6,913	
29	29 January 2000	Hull City	H	0–2	1,900	
30	5 February 2000	Rotherham United	A	1–2	4,175	Rioch 5' (pen)
31	12 February 2000	Barnet	H	2–0	2,114	Barker 18', Askey 64'
32	19 February 2000	Hartlepool United	A	4–1	2,823	Durkan 8', Barker 22', 47', Askey 37'
33	19 February 2000	Lincoln City	H	1–1	2,445	Askey 26'
34	3 March 2000	Southend United	A	0–1	3,725	
35	7 March 2000	York City	H	1–1	1,581	Durkan 22'
36	11 March 2000	Mansfield Town	A	0–1	2,327	
37	18 March 2000	Peterborough United	H	1–1	2,309	Moore 90'
38	18 March 2000	Brighton & Hove Albion	A	2–5	5,596	Askey 8', Whitehead 33'
39	18 March 2000	Shrewsbury Town	H	4–2	1,913	Collins 8', Whitehead 21', 60', Tomlinson 84'
40	1 April 2000	Leyton Orient	A	0–0	4,302	
41	8 April 2000	Plymouth Argyle	H	4–1	2,231	Askey 2', Durkan 15', Whitehead 30', 89'
42	15 April 2000	Carlisle United	A	1–0	3,047	Whitehead 59'
43	22 April 2000	Chester City	H	1–1	3,456	Askey 30'
44	24 April 2000	Torquay United	A	2–3	2,139	Askey 9', Ware 18'
45	29 April 2000	Rochdale	H	1–2	2,202	Tomlinson 23'
46	6 May 2000	Halifax Town	A	0–1	2,007	

=== League Cup ===
Round	Date	Opponent	Venue	Result	Attendance	Scorers
R1 1st Leg	10 August 1999	Stoke City	H	1–1	2,551	Priest 76'
R1 2nd Leg	25 August 1999	Stoke City	A	0–3	5,003	

=== FA Cup ===
Round	Date	Opponent	Venue	Result	Attendance	Scorers
R1	30 October 1999	Hull City	H	0–0	2,401	
R1 Replay	6 November 1999	Hull City	A	0–4	4,844	

=== Football League Trophy ===
Round	Date	Opponent	Venue	Result	Attendance	Scorers
R2	11 January 2000	Rochdale	A	2–3 (a.e.t.)	1,123	Davies 10', Barker 106'

== Squad ==
Appearances for competitive matches only

Pos.	Name	League		FA Cup		League Cup		Football League Trophy		Total	
Pos.	Name	Apps	Goals	Apps	Goals	Apps	Goals	Apps	Goals	Apps	Goals
DF	(Nigeria) George Abbey	12(6)	0	0(2)	0	1	0	0	0	13(8)	0
FW	(England) John Askey	37(3)	15	2	0	1(1)	0	1	0	41(4)	15
DF	(England) Mike Bamber	0(1)	0	0	0	0	0	0	0	0(1)	0
FW	(England) Richard Barker	35	16	2	0	2	0	1	1	40	17
DF	(England) Greg Brown	2(3)	0	0	0	0(1)	0	0	0	2(4)	0
MF	(England) Chris Byrne	5	0	0	0	0	0	0	0	5	0
DF	(England) Simon Collins	37(2)	3	2	0	1	0	1	0	41(2)	3
MF	(Wales) Simon Davies	30(6)	1	2	0	2	0	1	0	35(6)	1
MF	(Republic of Ireland) Kieron Durkan	41(1)	6	2	0	0(1)	0	1	0	44(2)	6
MF	(England) Steve Hitchen	2(3)	0	0	0	0	0	0	0	2(3)	0
DF	(England) Rae Ingram	35(1)	0	2	0	1	0	0	0	37(1)	0
GK	(England) Richard Knight	3	0	0	0	0	0	0	0	3	0
GK	(England) Lee Martin	21	0	2	0	0	0	1	0	24	0
DF	(England) Neil Moore	12(3)	2	0	0	0	0	1	0	13(3)	2
DF	(England) Karl Munroe	1(4)	0	0	0	0	0	0	0	1(4)	0
DF	(England) Paul O'Neill	0(1)	0	0	0	0	0	0	0	0(1)	0
GK	(England) Ryan Price	11(1)	0	0	0	2	0	0	0	13(1)	0
MF	(England) Chris Priest	34(2)	4	2	0	2	1	0	0	38(2)	5
DF	(England) Gregor Rioch	42	5	2	0	2	0	1	0	47	5
MF	(England) Ben Sedgemore	31(4)	1	2	0	2	0	1	0	36(4)	1
DF	(Wales) Darren Tinson	46	1	2	0	2	0	1	0	51	1
FW	(England) Graeme Tomlinson	7(11)	2	0(2)	0	1(1)	0	0	0	8(14)	2
MF	(England) Paul Ware	9(9)	2	0(2)	0	1	0	0	0	10(11)	2
FW	(England) Damien Whitehead	10(13)	6	0	0	0	0	0(1)	0	10(14)	6
MF	(England) Stuart Whittaker	2(7)	0	0(1)	0	1(1)	0	0(1)	0	3(10)	0
GK	(Wales) Anthony Williams	11	0	0	0	0	0	0	0	11	0
MF	(England) Steve Wood	30(6)	1	0(1)	0	1(1)	0	1	0	32(8)	1

== See also ==
- 1999–2000 in English football
