= 1997–98 Luton Town F.C. season =

English football club season

Luton Town
1997–98 season
- Chairman: David Kohler
- Manager: Lennie Lawrence
- Stadium: Kenilworth Road
- Second Division: 17th
- FA Cup: First round
- League Cup: Second round
- Football League Trophy: Southern Semi-final
- Top goalscorer: League: Tony Thorpe (14); All: Tony Thorpe (19)
- Highest home attendance: 9,041 (vs. Watford, Second Division, 4 October 1997)
- Lowest home attendance: 2,816 (vs. Colchester United, League Cup, 26 August 1997)
- Average home league attendance: 5,879

The 1997–98 season was the 112th season in the history of Luton Town F.C. It was Luton Town's 77th consecutive season in the Football League, and their 80th overall. It was their second season back in the Football League Third Division following relegation in the 1995–96 season.

This article covers the period from 1 July 1997 to 30 June 1998.

== Season summary ==
During the 1997–98 English football season, Luton Town F.C. competed in the Football League Second Division. It was the second full season of Lennie Lawrences's spell as Luton Town manager. Hopes were high for promotion following Luton's 3rd place finish the previous season, however injuries to key players in September and October saw Luton Town fall into the relegation zone. They subsequently spent the season battling at the wrong end of the division. Luton were in the relegation zone as late as April and only secured their safety following a 2–2 draw with Brentford in the second last game of the season. Luton's survival was due in no small part to the arrival of Rory Allen on loan from Tottenham Hotspur F.C.. Allen arrived at the end of March with Luton Town sitting 23rd in the table with only 8 games remaining. Allen scored 6 goals in that time which resulted in 5 wins and 1 draw for Luton Town

== Final league table ==
Pos	Team	Pld	W	D	L	GF	GA	GD	Pts
15	Preston North End	46	15	14	17	56	56	0	59
16	York City	46	14	17	15	52	58	−6	59
17	Luton Town	46	14	15	17	60	64	−4	57
18	Millwall	46	14	13	19	43	54	−11	55
19	Walsall	46	14	12	20	43	52	−9	54

Rules for classification: In the Football League goals scored (GF) takes precedence over goal difference (GD).

== Results ==
Luton Town's score comes first

=== Legend ===
Win	Draw	Loss

=== Football League Second Division ===
Date	Opponent	Venue	Result	Attendance	Scorers
09 August 1997	Blackpool	Away	0–1	6,547	
18 August 1997	Southend United	Home	1–0	5,140	Stuart Douglas
23 August 1997	Fulham	Away	0–0	8,142	
30 August 1997	Oldham Athletic	Home	1–1	5,404	Tony Thorpe
02 September 1997	Millwall	Home	0–2	5,781	
09 September 1997	Northampton Town	Away	0–1	7,246	
13 September 1997	AFC Bournemouth	Away	1–1	4,561	Dwight Marshall
20 September 1997	Wrexham	Home	2–5	5,241	Steve Davis, Phil Gray
27 September 1997	Bristol City	Away	0–3	8,509	
04 October 1997	Watford	Home	0–4	9,041	
11 October 1997	Plymouth Argyle	Home	3–0	4,931	Tony Thorpe (2), Simon Davies
18 October 1997	Wigan Athletic	Away	1–1	4,466	David Oldfield
21 October 1997	Carlisle United	Away	1–0	4,341	Alan White
25 October 1997	Brentford	Home	2–0	5,972	Graham Alexander, Tony Thorpe
01 November 1997	Wycombe Wanderers	Away	2–2	6,219	David Oldfield, Tony Thorpe
04 November 1997	Burnley	Home	2–3	5,315	Graham Alexander (2)
08 November 1997	Preston North End	Home	1–3	5,767	Tony Thorpe
22 November 1997	Walsall	Home	0–1	4,726	
29 November 1997	York City	Away	2–1	3,636	Graham Alexander, Tony Thorpe
02 December 1997	Gillingham	Home	2–2	4,408	Steve Davis, Tony Thorpe
13 December 1997	Chesterfield	Away	0–0	4,358	
20 December 1997	Bristol Rovers	Home	2–4	5,266	Chris Allen, David Oldfield
26 December 1997	Northampton	Home	2–2	8,035	David Oldfield, Tony Thorpe
28 December 1997	Millwall	Away	2–0	7,461	Steve Davis, Tony Thorpe
03 January 1998	Southend United	Away	2–1	5,056	Graham Alexander (2)
10 January 1998	Blackpool	Home	3–0	5,574	Tony Thorpe (3)
17 January 1998	Oldham Athletic	Away	1–2	6,057	Graham Alexander
24 January 1998	Fulham	Home	1–4	8,366	Tony Thorpe
31 January 1998	AFC Bournemouth	Home	1–2	5,466	Marvin Johnson
07 February 1998	Wrexham	Away	1–2	3,527	Steve Davis
14 February 1998	Watford	Away	1–1	15,182	Marvin Johnson
21 February 1998	Bristol City	Home	0–0	6,405	
24 February 1998	Wigan Athletic	Home	1–1	4,403	David Oldfield
28 February 1998	Plymouth Argyle	Away	2–0	4,846	Andrew Fotiadis, Sean Evers
03 March 1998	Preston North End	Away	0–1	6,992	
07 March 1998	Wycombe Wanderers	Home	0–0	6,114	
14 March 1998	Burnley	Away	1–1	9,656	Mitchell Thomas
21 March 1998	Grimsby Town	Home	2–2	5,722	Sean Evers, Steve Davis
28 March 1998	Walsall	Away	3–2	3,922	David Oldfield, Rory Allen, Dwight Marshall
04 April 1998	York City	Home	3–0	5,541	Graham Alexander(pen), David Oldfield, Phil Gray
07 April 1998	Grimsby Town	Away	1–0	4,455	Rory Allen
11 April 1998	Gillingham	Away	1–2	6,846	Rory Allen
14 April 1998	Chesterfield	Home	3–0	5,884	Dwight Marshall, Rory Allen, David Oldfield
18 April 1998	Bristol Rovers	Away	1–2	8,038	David Oldfield
25 April 1998	Brentford	Away	2–2	6,596	Dwight Marshall, Rory Allen
02 May 1998	Carlisle United	Home	3–2	6,729	Sean Evers, (og), Rory Allen

=== FA Cup ===
Round	Date	Opponent	Venue	Result	Attendance	Goalscorers
R1	15 November 1997	Torquay United	Home	0–1	3,446	

=== League Cup ===
Round	Date	Opponent	Venue	Result	Attendance	Goalscorers
R1 1st leg	12 August 1997	Colchester United	Away	1–0	2,840	Tony Thorpe
R1 2nd leg	26 August 1997	Colchester United	Home	1–1	2,816	Tony Thorpe
R2 1st leg	16 September 1997	West Bromwich Albion	Home	1–1	3,437	Stuart Douglas
R2 2nd leg	23 September 1997	West Bromwich Albion	Away	2–4	7,227	Steve Davis, Tony Thorpe

=== Football League Trophy ===
Round	Date	Opponent	Venue	Result	Attendance	Goalscorers
SR2	06 January 1998	Brentford	Home	2–1	3,106	Tony Thorpe, David Oldfield
SQF	27 January 1998	Fulham	Away	2–1	5,103	Dwight Marshall, Tony Thorpe
SSF	17 February 1998	AFC Bournemouth	Away	0–1	5,367	

== Squad ==
Note: Flags indicate national team as defined under FIFA eligibility rules; some limited exceptions apply. Players may hold more than one non-FIFA nationality.

No.	Pos.	Nation	Player
—	GK	(England) ENG	Nathan Abbey
—	GK	(England) ENG	Kelvin Davis
—	GK	(United States) USA	Ian Feuer
—	GK	(Wales) WAL	Andy Dibble
—	DF	(Scotland) SCO	Graham Alexander
—	DF	(England) ENG	Steve Davis
—	DF	(England) ENG	Richard Harvey
—	DF	(England) ENG	Julian James
—	DF	(England) ENG	Marvin Johnson
—	DF	(England) ENG	Gavin McGowan
—	DF	(Northern Ireland) NIR	Darren Patterson
—	DF	(England) ENG	Trevor Peake
—	DF	(England) ENG	Mitchell Thomas
—	DF	(England) ENG	Alan White
—	DF	(England) ENG	Bryan Small
—	DF	(Republic of Ireland) IRL	Gary Doherty
—	DF	(Scotland) SCO	Stuart Fraser

No.	Pos.	Nation	Player
—	DF	(England) ENG	Chris Willmott
—	MF	(England) ENG	Sean Evers
—	MF	(England) ENG	Paul McLaren
—	MF	(England) ENG	David Oldfield
—	MF	(England) ENG	Paul Showler
—	MF	(Republic of Ireland) IRL	Gary Waddock
—	MF	(England) ENG	Chris Allen
—	MF	(England) ENG	Matthew Spring
—	MF	(England) ENG	Robert Kean
—	MF	(Wales) WAL	Simon Davies
—	FW	(England) ENG	Stuart Douglas
—	FW	(England) ENG	Andrew Fotiadis
—	FW	(Republic of Ireland) IRL	Liam George
—	FW	(Jamaica) JAM	Dwight Marshall
—	FW	(England) ENG	Tony Thorpe
—	FW	(Northern Ireland) NIR	Phil Gray
—	FW	(England) ENG	Rory Allen

== Player statistics ==
Pos.	Name	League		FA Cup		League Cup		FL Trophy		Total	
Pos.	Name	Apps	Goals	Apps	Goals	Apps	Goals	Apps	Goals	Apps	Goals
MF	(England) David Oldfield	45	9	1	0	4	1	3	0	53	10
MF	(England) Paul McLaren	41 (2)	0	1	0	4	0	2	0	48 (2)	0
DF	(England) Steve Davis	39	5	0	0	4	0	2	0	45	5
DF	(Scotland) Graham Alexander	39	8	1	0	2	0	2	0	44	8
MF	(Republic of Ireland) Gary Waddock	34 (2)	0	1	0	4	0	0 (2)	0	39 (4)	0
DF	(England) Mitchell Thomas	28 (2)	1	0	0	2	0	2	0	32 (2)	1
FW	(England) Tony Thorpe	27 (1)	14	1	0	2 (1)	2	1 (1)	0	31 (3)	16
GK	(England) Kelvin Davis	32	0	0	0	0	0	1	0	33	0
DF	(England) Alan White	26 (2)	1	1	0	1	0	3	0	31 (2)	1
FW	(Jamaica) Dwight Marshall	19 (10)	4	0	0	2	1	2	0	23 (10)	5
DF	(Northern Ireland) Darren Patterson	23	0	0 (1)	0	0	0	3	0	26 (1)	0
MF	(England) Sean Evers	14 (8)	3	0	0	2	0	3	0	19 (8)	3
MF	(Wales) Simon Davies	8 (11)	1	0 (1)	0	3 (1)	0	3	0	14 (13)	1
DF	(England) Julian James	23 (1)	0	1	0	1	0	0	0	25 (1)	0
FW	(England) Stuart Douglas	5 (11)	1	0	0	3 (1)	0	0	0	8 (12)	1
FW	(Northern Ireland) Phil Gray	14 (3)	2	0	0	1	0	0 (1)	0	15 (4)	2
MF	(England) Chris Allen	14	1	0	0	0	0	3	0	17	1
GK	(United States) Ian Feuer	13	0	1	0	1	0	2	0	17	0
FW	(England) Andrew Fotiadis	5 (11)	1	1	0	0	0	0	0	6 (11)	1
DF	(England) Bryan Small	16	0	0	0	0	0	0	0	16	0
DF	(England) Marvin Johnson	12 (1)	2	0	0	3	0	0	0	15 (1)	2
MF	(England) Matthew Spring	6 (6)	0	1	0	0	0	0	0	7 (6)	0
DF	(England) Richard Harvey	6 (1)	0	1	0	2 (1)	0	1	0	10 (2)	0
DF	(Republic of Ireland) Gary Doherty	1 (8)	0	0 (1)	0	0	0	0	0	1 (9)	0
FW	(England) Rory Allen	8	6	0	0	0	0	0	0	8	6
DF	(England) Gavin McGowan	6 (2)	0	0	0	0	0	0	0	6 (2)	0
FW	(Republic of Ireland) Liam George	1	0	0	0	0 (2)	0	0 (1)	0	1 (3)	0
GK	(Wales) Andy Dibble	1	0	0	0	2	0	0	0	3	0
DF	(Scotland) Stuart Fraser	1	0	0	0	0	0	0	0	1	0
GK	(England) Nathan Abbey	0	0	0	0	1	0	0	0	1	0
MF	(England) Robert Kean	0 (1)	0	0	0	0	0	0	0	0 (1)	0
MF	(England) Paul Showler	0 (1)	0	0	0	0	0	0	0	0 (1)	0
DF	(England) Trevor Peake	0 (1)	0	0	0	0	0	0	0	0 (1)	0
—	own goal	—	1	—	0	—	0	—	0	—	1
