= Paul O'Neill (footballer) =

English footballer

Personal information
- Full name: Paul Dennis O'Neill
- Date of birth: 17 June 1982 (age 44)
- Place of birth: Bolton, England
- Position: Defender

Senior career*
Years	Team	Apps	(Gls)
1999–2003	Macclesfield Town	36	(0)
2003–2004	Gretna	2	(0)
2004–2007	Bangor City		
2007–2009	Rhyl		
2009–2013	Prestatyn Town		
2013–	Chorley		
- * Club domestic league appearances and goals

Paul Dennis O'Neill (born 17 June 1982) is an English footballer who played in The Football League for Macclesfield Town. He made his professional debut towards the end of the 1999–2000 season. He moved to playing league football in Wales in 2004. Signed for non league club Chorley in 2013
