= Rae Ingram =

English footballer (born 1974)

Personal information
- Full name: Rae Ingram
- Date of birth: 6 December 1974 (age 51)
- Place of birth: Manchester, England
- Height: 5 ft 11 in (1.80 m)
- Position: Full back

Youth career
- Manchester City

Senior career*
Years	Team	Apps	(Gls)
1993–1998	Manchester City	23	(0)
1998	→ Macclesfield Town (loan)	5	(0)
1998–2001	Macclesfield Town	98	(1)
2001–2003	Port Vale	28	(0)
2003–2004	Bangor City	14	(1)
Total		168	(2)
- * Club domestic league appearances and goals

Rae Ingram (born 6 December 1974) is an English former professional footballer and sports masseur.

As a player, he was a defender, who played 152 league games in a ten-year career in the English Football League and Premier League. He began his career at Manchester City in July 1993 and made 21 appearances over the next five years. He was loaned out to Macclesfield Town in March 1993 and helped the "Silkmen" to promotion out of the Third Division in 1997–98. He joined the club permanently in July 1998 before moving to Port Vale in June 2001. He left Vale Park in May 2003 and spent one season in the Welsh Premier League with Bangor City before announcing his retirement. After retiring as a player, he became a fireman and a sports masseur at Macclesfield Town.

== Career ==
=== Manchester City ===
Ingram started his career at Manchester City, signing professional forms at Maine Road in July 1993 under Brian Horton's stewardship. After battles against relegation in 1993–94 and 1994–95, the "Sky Blues" lost their Premier League status in 1995–96 under Alan Ball. Ingram debuted on 30 August 1995 in a 2–0 home defeat to Everton and played four more top-flight games during the campaign. A centre-half, he was forced to play out of position at left-back due to a lack of specialist full-backs at the club. He featured 22 times in 1996–97, finding a first-team place from January onwards under new boss Frank Clark (who replaced short-term appointment Steve Coppell). He fell out of the first-team picture though in 1997–98, and finished the season on loan at Macclesfield Town, after recovering from a bout of ME. He made five league appearances for Sammy McIlroy's "Silkmen", helping the club to finish as runners-up of the Third Division.

=== Macclesfield Town ===
He went to Moss Rose permanently in July 1998 on a free transfer. Ingram made 34 appearances but could not prevent the club from finishing at the bottom of the Second Division in 1998–99. He played 39 times in 1999–2000 and 36 times in 2000–01. He scored his first and only senior goal on 14 October 2000 in a 2–1 home win over Cheltenham Town.

=== Port Vale ===
He signed with Port Vale in June 2001, reuniting him with former boss Brian Horton. He featured 28 times in 2001–02, having lost his first-team place at Vale Park by December 2001. He could only play four games in 2002–03, as he contracted meningitis in January 2003; after doctors confirmed it was the non-lethal strain he was released from hospital.

=== Bangor City ===
He was released by new manager Martin Foyle in May 2003, and subsequently signed for Welsh Premier League club Bangor City, who were managed by his former teammate Peter Davenport. He left Bangor at the end of the 2003–04 season, after making 14 league appearances, and went into retirement.

== Personal life ==
After retiring as a player, Ingram worked as a firefighter in Sale, Greater Manchester. He also worked as a masseur at Macclesfield Town from 2013.

== Career statistics ==
Appearances and goals by club, season and competition
Club	Season	League			FA Cup		Other		Total	
Club	Season	Division	Apps	Goals	Apps	Goals	Apps	Goals	Apps	Goals
Manchester City	1995–96	Premier League	5	0	1	0	0	0	6	0
Manchester City	1995–96	First Division	18	0	3	0	1	0	22	0
Manchester City	Total		23	0	4	0	1	0	28	0
Macclesfield Town	1997–98	Third Division	5	0	0	0	0	0	5	0
Macclesfield Town	1998–99	Second Division	29	0	3	0	3	0	35	0
Macclesfield Town	1999–2000	Third Division	36	0	2	0	2	0	40	0
Macclesfield Town	2000–01	Third Division	33	1	0	0	3	0	36	1
Macclesfield Town	Total		103	1	5	0	8	0	116	1
Port Vale	2001–02	Second Division	24	0	2	0	4	0	30	0
Port Vale	2002–03	Second Division	4	0	0	0	0	0	4	0
Port Vale	Total		28	0	2	0	4	0	34	0
Bangor City	2003–04	Welsh Premier League	14	1	0	0	0	0	14	1
Career total			168	2	11	0	13	0	192	2

== Honours ==
Macclesfield Town

- Football League Third Division second-place promotion: 1997–98
