= Simon Davies (footballer, born 1974) =

Welsh footballer (born 1974)

Personal information
- Full name: Simon Ithel Davies
- Date of birth: 23 April 1974 (age 52)
- Place of birth: Winsford, Cheshire, England
- Position: Midfielder

Team information
- Current team: Tottenham Hotspur Academy (Academy Director)

Youth career
- Manchester United

Senior career*
Years	Team	Apps	(Gls)
1992–1997	Manchester United	11	(0)
1993–1994	→ Exeter City (loan)	6	(1)
1996	→ Huddersfield Town (loan)	3	(0)
1997–1998	Luton Town	22	(1)
1998–2000	Macclesfield Town	48	(3)
2000–2001	Rochdale	12	(1)
2001–2003	Bangor City	60	(8)
2003–2004	Total Network Solutions	18	(0)
2004–2005	Bangor City	16	(1)
2005	Rhyl	14	(0)
2006–2007	Chester City	0	(0)
2007	Airbus UK	0	(0)
Total		210	(14)

International career
1996	Wales	1	(0)

Managerial career
- 2007: Chester City (caretaker)
- 2008: Chester City
- 2016–2018: Manchester City EDS
- 2019: Anderlecht
- * Club domestic league appearances and goals

Simon Ithel Davies (born 23 April 1974) is a professional football coach and former player who is the Academy Director at Tottenham Hotspur's Academy.

As a player, he was a midfielder who notably played in the Premier League for Manchester United, where he was part of the famous 1992 youth team. He later played in The Football League for Exeter City, Huddersfield Town, Luton Town, Macclesfield Town and Rochdale. He wound up his playing days in the Welsh Premier League with Bangor City, Total Network Solutions, Rhyl and Airbus UK. He was capped once for Wales, in a match against Switzerland in 1996.

Davies went into coaching towards the end of his career, where he was a youth team coach at Chester City. He was caretaker manager of the club in 2007 and 2008. In 2010, Davies joined Manchester City where he eventually became the EDS manager and the Head of the Youth Academy. In 2019 he joined the coaching staff at Anderlecht and briefly managed the club before relinquishing his duties and reverting to his previous role. In August 2022, Davies became Head of Coaching Methodology at Tottenham Hotspur's academy. He was then promoted in June 2023 to Academy Director.

== Playing career ==
During his career he played for a few English clubs in the 1990s, after starting out at Manchester United. He scored the opening goal in a 4–0 Champions League win against Galatasaray and played 20 first team games for the club, although he failed to add any more goals. He was part of an acclaimed batch of youngsters to come through the United ranks in this period, after winning the FA Youth Cup in 1992, with his colleagues who lifted the trophy including David Beckham, Nicky Butt and Gary Neville.

Although born in England, Davies was capped for the Welsh national team against Switzerland in 1996. After leaving Manchester United for Luton Town in a £150,000 deal in August 1997, Davies struggled to recapture his early promise and his league career was to end with spells with Macclesfield Town and Rochdale. He then crossed the Welsh border, becoming Peter Davenport's first signing at Bangor City in the Welsh Premier League in 2001. He was named as the Welsh Premier League's player of the season in 2002–03. He also played for Rhyl and Total Network Solutions and would briefly join Airbus UK.

== Coaching and management ==
In 2006, Davies joined the coaching staff at Chester City, predominantly as part of the youth set-up. In April 2007, he was appointed as the club's caretaker manager after the departure of Mark Wright. He took charge for the final game of the season, as Chester lost 2–0 at Lincoln City.

Despite the loss, Davies was offered an interview for the job on a permanent basis but Bobby Williamson was subsequently appointed, although Davies remained at the club as youth team manager. The following March, Davies was again appointed as Chester's caretaker manager following Williamson's sacking. Despite losing his two games in caretaker charge, Davies was named manager until the end of the season on 11 March 2008. His first win followed in a 2–1 success against Darlington on 22 March and Chester went on to clinch survival in their penultimate match of the season with a 0–0 draw against Stockport County. A few days earlier, Davies celebrated his 34th birthday with a new two-year contract at the club.

Davies endured a difficult start to the 2008–09 season, with Chester conceding six to both Dagenham & Redbridge and Rochdale in the first three months of the season and making early exits from all three cup competitions. He was sacked on 10 November 2008. Exactly a month later, it was announced Davies had returned to Chester as youth team manager.

In 2010, Davies joined Manchester City as part of their youth coaching programme. From 2013 to 2015, he was assistant to EDS manager Patrick Vieira. In January 2016, Davies succeeded Vieira as manager, when the Frenchman left the club to join New York City. He left the position in 2018 to become Head of Academy Coaching, with specific focus on the younger age groups.

In July 2019, Davies joined Vincent Kompany as part of the coaching set-up at Anderlecht. On 22 August, Davies became the head coach after Kompany decided to step down from managerial duties to focus primarily on being a player. Davies's first match in charge was a 1–0 loss to Genk, and his second brought Anderlecht their first win of the season, 1–0 over Standard Liège. However, in his next three games, he oversaw two defeats to Club Brugge and Royal Antwerp and a goalless draw against Waasland-Beveren. On 3 October, Davies was demoted back to assistant manager, with the club appointing former manager Franky Vercauteren.

On 12 August 2022, Davies was appointed to the new role of Head of Coaching Methodology at Tottenham Hotspur's academy. On 20 June 2023, he succeeded Dean Rastrick as Academy Director.

== Career statistics ==
Appearances and goals by club, season and competition
Club	Season	League			National cup		League cup		Continental		Other (Note: Includes other competitive competitions, including the FA Charity Shield and Football League Trophy.)		Total	
Club	Season	Division	Apps	Goals	Apps	Goals	Apps	Goals	Apps	Goals	Apps	Goals	Apps	Goals
Manchester United	1992–93	Premier League	0	0	0	0	0	0	0	0	0	0	0	0
Manchester United	1993–94	Premier League	0	0	0	0	0	0	0	0	0	0	0	0
Manchester United	1994–95	Premier League	5	0	0	0	3	0	2	1	0	0	10	1
Manchester United	1995–96	Premier League	6	0	0	0	1	0	1	0	0	0	8	0
Manchester United	1996–97	Premier League	0	0	0	0	2	0	0	0	0	0	2	0
Manchester United	Total		11	0	0	0	6	0	3	1	0	0	20	1
Exeter City (loan)	1993–94	Second Division	6	1	1	0	0	0	—		—		7	1
Huddersfield Town (loan)	1996–97	First Division	3	0	0	0	0	0	—		—		3	0
Luton Town	1997–98	Second Division	20	1	1	0	4	0	—		3	0	28	1
Luton Town	1998–99	Second Division	2	0	0	0	0	0	—		0	0	2	0
Luton Town	Total		22	1	1	0	4	0	—		3	0	30	1
Macclesfield Town	1998–99	Second Division	12	2	1	0	0	0	—		0	0	13	2
Macclesfield Town	1999–2000	Third Division	36	1	2	0	2	0	—		1	1	41	2
Macclesfield Town	Total		48	3	3	0	2	0	—		1	1	54	4
Rochdale	2000–01	Third Division	12	1	1	0	2	0	—		1	0	16	1
Career total			102	6	6	0	14	0	3	1	5	1	130	8

== Honours ==
Manchester United

- FA Youth Cup: 1991–92

Individual

- Welsh Premier League Player of the Season: 2002–03
