= Uwe Rösler =

German association football manager

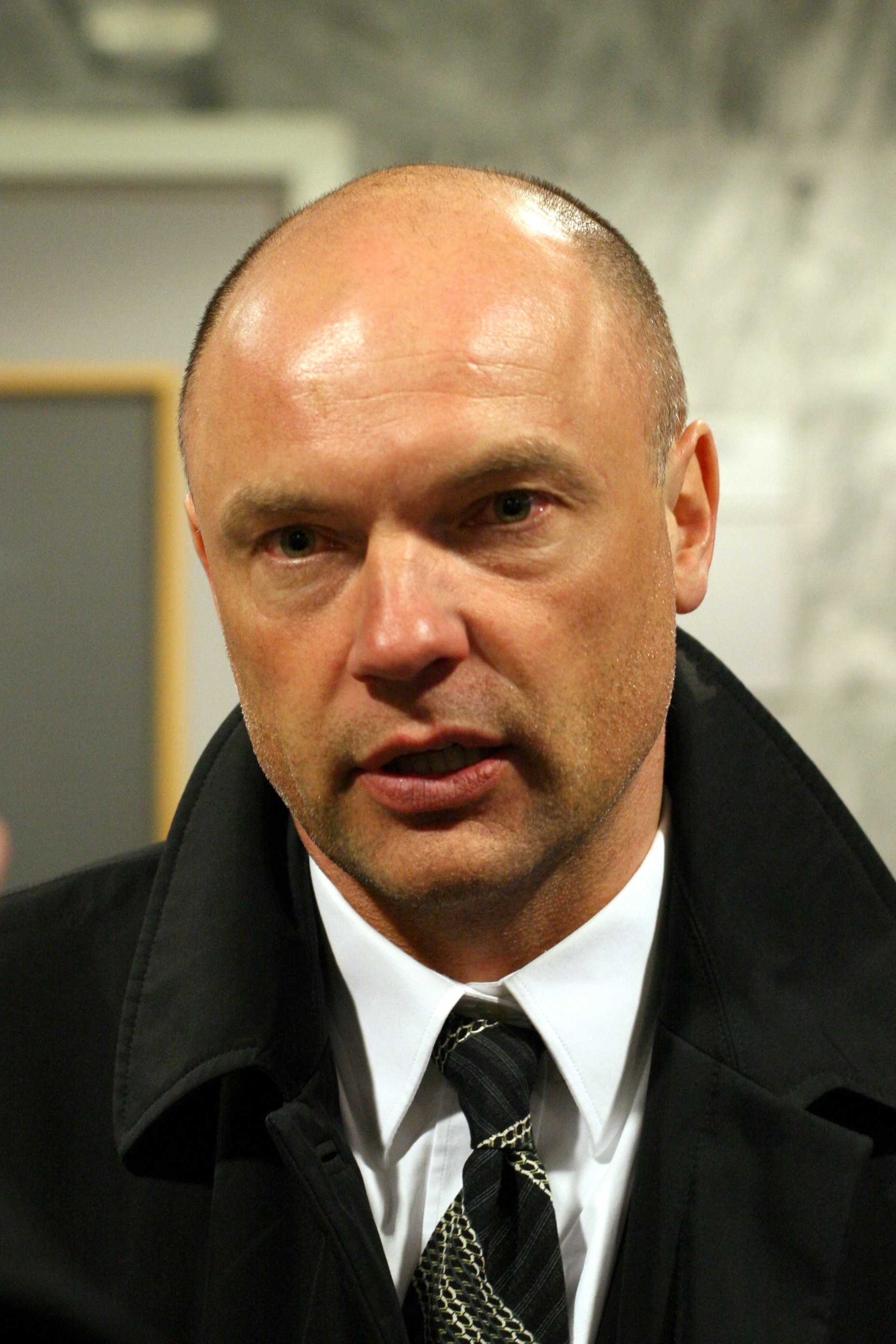
- Rösler in 2009

Personal information
- Date of birth: 15 November 1968 (age 58)
- Place of birth: Altenburg, East Germany
- Height: 1.85 m (6 ft 1 in)
- Position: Forward

Team information
- Current team: VfL Bochum (manager)

Youth career
- –1981: BSG Traktor Starkenberg
- 1981–1987: 1. FC Lokomotive Leipzig

Senior career*
| Years | Team | Apps | (Gls) |
| 1987–1988 | 1. FC Lokomotive Leipzig | 3 | (0) |
| 1988–1989 | BSG Chemie Leipzig | 27 | (6) |
| 1989–1990 | 1. FC Magdeburg | 46 | (19) |
| 1990–1992 | Dynamo Dresden | 46 | (7) |
| 1992–1994 | 1. FC Nürnberg | 28 | (0) |
| 1993–1994 | → Dynamo Dresden (loan) | 7 | (0) |
| 1994–1998 | Manchester City | 152 | (50) |
| 1998–1999 | 1. FC Kaiserslautern | 28 | (8) |
| 1999–2000 | Tennis Borussia Berlin | 28 | (6) |
| 2000–2002 | Southampton | 24 | (0) |
| 2001 | → West Bromwich Albion (loan) | 5 | (1) |
| 2002 | SpVgg Unterhaching | 14 | (5) |
| 2002–2003 | Lillestrøm | 11 | (10) |
| Total | | 419 | (112) |

International career
| | East Germany U21 | 6 | (1) |
| 1990 | East Germany | 5 | (0) |

Managerial career
- 2004–2006: Lillestrøm
- 2006–2009: Viking
- 2010: Molde
- 2011–2013: Brentford
- 2013–2014: Wigan Athletic
- 2015: Leeds United
- 2016–2018: Fleetwood Town
- 2018–2019: Malmö FF
- 2020–2021: Fortuna Düsseldorf
- 2022–2025: AGF
- 2025–: VfL Bochum
- * Club domestic league appearances and goals

Uwe Rösler (German pronunciation: [ˈuːvə ˈrøːslɐ]; born 15 November 1968) is a German football manager and former player who is the manager of 2. Bundesliga club VfL Bochum.

As a player he was a centre forward, notably playing in the Premier League for Manchester City, where he was the leading goalscorer for three consecutive seasons from 1994–95 to 1996–97, and in the Bundesliga for 1. FC Nürnberg and 1. FC Kaiserslautern, playing in the UEFA Champions League with the latter. He also played Premier League football for Southampton, in the Football League for West Bromwich Albion and in Norway for Lillestrøm. Back in his native Germany, he represented 1. FC Lokomotive Leipzig, BSG Chemie Leipzig, 1. FC Magdeburg, Dynamo Dresden, Tennis Borussia Berlin and SpVgg Unterhaching.

Rösler is a former East Germany international, whom he represented in the under-21 team and five times as a senior.

In 2004, he began his managerial career with Lillestrøm in Norway, and later led Viking and Molde FK in Tippeligaen. He also managed Brentford, Wigan Athletic, Leeds United and Fleetwood Town in the English Football League, as well as Malmö FF in Allsvenskan, Fortuna Düsseldorf in the Bundesliga, and most recently AGF in the Danish Superliga.

== Club career ==
=== (East) Germany ===
Born in Altenburg, Rösler started his career in the former GDR, joining Lokomotive Leipzig in 1981, where he reached the first team in 1987 and spent two third of his first season in men's football including two appearances in Lok's European campaign, before moving on to BSG Chemie Leipzig in 1988. Following this he transferred to 1. FC Magdeburg in 1989, where he spent a year before signing for Dynamo Dresden in the winter 1990–91. After two years with Dresden, he also spent two years with 1. FC Nürnberg, where he failed to score once in 28 games, resulting in him being loaned back to Dresden for the second year. Having grown up in the East, where players were nominally regarded as amateurs, Rösler found it difficult to adapt when he moved to the West after reunification: "I suddenly saw more individualistic thinking, cliques, a powerful press and personal politics around team selection. The Wall was still there in some people's heads and in many ways I was naive."

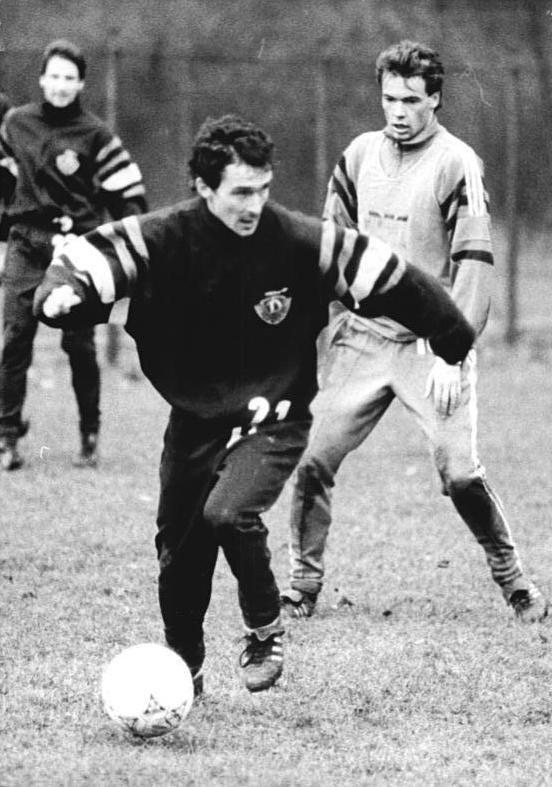
Rösler (right) and Hans-Uwe Pilz training with Dynamo Dresden in December 1990

=== Manchester City ===
In March 1994, Rösler joined Manchester City on trial. Given an opportunity in a reserve match against Burnley, he scored two goals, which resulted in a three-month loan. He made his first team debut the following Saturday, against Queens Park Rangers. A return of five goals in twelve games saw the move made permanent in the close season, reports of the transfer fee varying between £375,000 and £500,000.

After an ignominious start to the 1994–95 campaign, when he was sent off in a 3–0 opening day defeat at Arsenal, Rösler formed a productive partnership with Paul Walsh, and scored 22 league and cup goals despite missing several games through injury. In an FA cup match against Notts County he scored four goals, becoming the first Manchester City player to score four in an FA Cup tie since Johnny Hart in 1953. His performances that season meant he was the club's leading goalscorer, and he won the club's Player of the Year award.

At the start of the 1995–96 season, Alan Ball became manager and immediately changed the nature of the side. Despite City's obvious strengths down the flanks, the team was adapted to play through the middle of the park. With no supply line from the wings (City's other winger Nicky Summerbee often playing at right-back), and with the loss through injury of Beagrie and the shocking sale of Walsh, Rösler struggled in this season. Many felt that he and fellow striker Niall Quinn were too similar to play in a system that didn't feed strikers effectively and Rösler clearly became unhappy. Much publicised disagreements with the manager culminated in Rösler being dropped from the side, only to be brought on as a sub in the Manchester derby and immediately score a phenomenal goal. Rösler's goal celebrations saw him running to the bench, shouting at Ball and pointing to his name and squad number on the back of his shirt. City were relegated to Division One at the end of the campaign, but Rösler opted to stay with the Blues. Despite another difficult campaign, Rösler again finished top scorer and clearly benefited from the return to a 4–4–1–1 formation. After another spell out with injury, Rösler would eventually leave the Blues in May 1998 on a free transfer following relegation to Division Two.

In his four years at City he played 176 games, scoring 64 goals. He was admitted to City's "Hall of Fame" in December 2009.

=== Return to Germany ===
In the summer of 1998, Rösler returned to Germany joining Kaiserslautern, then reigning German champions, for one season. His most remarkable game there was on 9 December 1998 when he came on as a substitute against HJK and scored a second half hat-trick as Kaiserslautern won 5–2, helping them to win their group in the 1998–99 UEFA Champions League, before going out in the quarter-finals to Bayern Munich. He then moved on to Tennis Borussia Berlin for the 1999–2000 season.

=== Southampton ===
When Tennis Borussia went bankrupt in the summer of 2000, Glenn Hoddle snapped Rösler up on a free transfer, but he was unable to become a regular in Saints' first team as James Beattie started to find his form (scoring 10 goals in 10 games in November and December). Rösler also suffered a groin injury which required surgery, keeping him out for several weeks. Although he was a whole-hearted and committed player, he only managed to score once for the Saints, in a League Cup game at Mansfield Town.

Rösler scored the last goal at The Dell on 26 May 2001 in a friendly against Brighton & Hove Albion – who were selected as Southampton's opponents as they had been the stadium's first visitors when it opened in 1898 – as Saints won 1–0. However, the distinction of the last competitive goal at The Dell went to Rösler's teammate Matt Le Tissier, who had scored a late winner in the 3–2 Premier League win over Arsenal seven days earlier.

In the following season, he only made a handful of appearances before being loaned out to West Bromwich Albion on 30 October 2001, as cover for the injured Scott Dobie. He made his debut away at Crystal Palace on 31 October 2001, and his only goal for Albion came in a 1–0 home win over Nottingham Forest four days later. Rösler played just five games for West Bromwich Albion, as he joined German side SpVgg Unterhaching on a free transfer in January 2002, who went on to win promotion as Division One runners-up at the end of the 2001–02 season.

=== Lillestrøm ===
In July 2002, Rösler signed for Norwegian club Lillestrøm. He played 11 matches and scored 10 goals for the Canaries in the latter part of the 2002 season.

After the first match of the season in 2003, in which he scored the match winner in a 1–0 defeat of Bodø/Glimt, Rösler was diagnosed with cancer, when x-rays discovered a tumour in his chest, and had to put an end to his playing career. After chemotherapy, he made a full recovery. While in remission, Rösler obtained his coaching badges, enabling him to continue working in football.

== International career ==
Rösler made his debut for East Germany on 26 January 1990 in a 2–1 win over Kuwait. He appeared in the team's final match against Belgium on 12 September 1990, 21 days before the German reunification. Overall, Rösler was capped five times, scoring no goals. He also represented East Germany U21s at international level.

== Management career ==
=== Lillestrøm ===
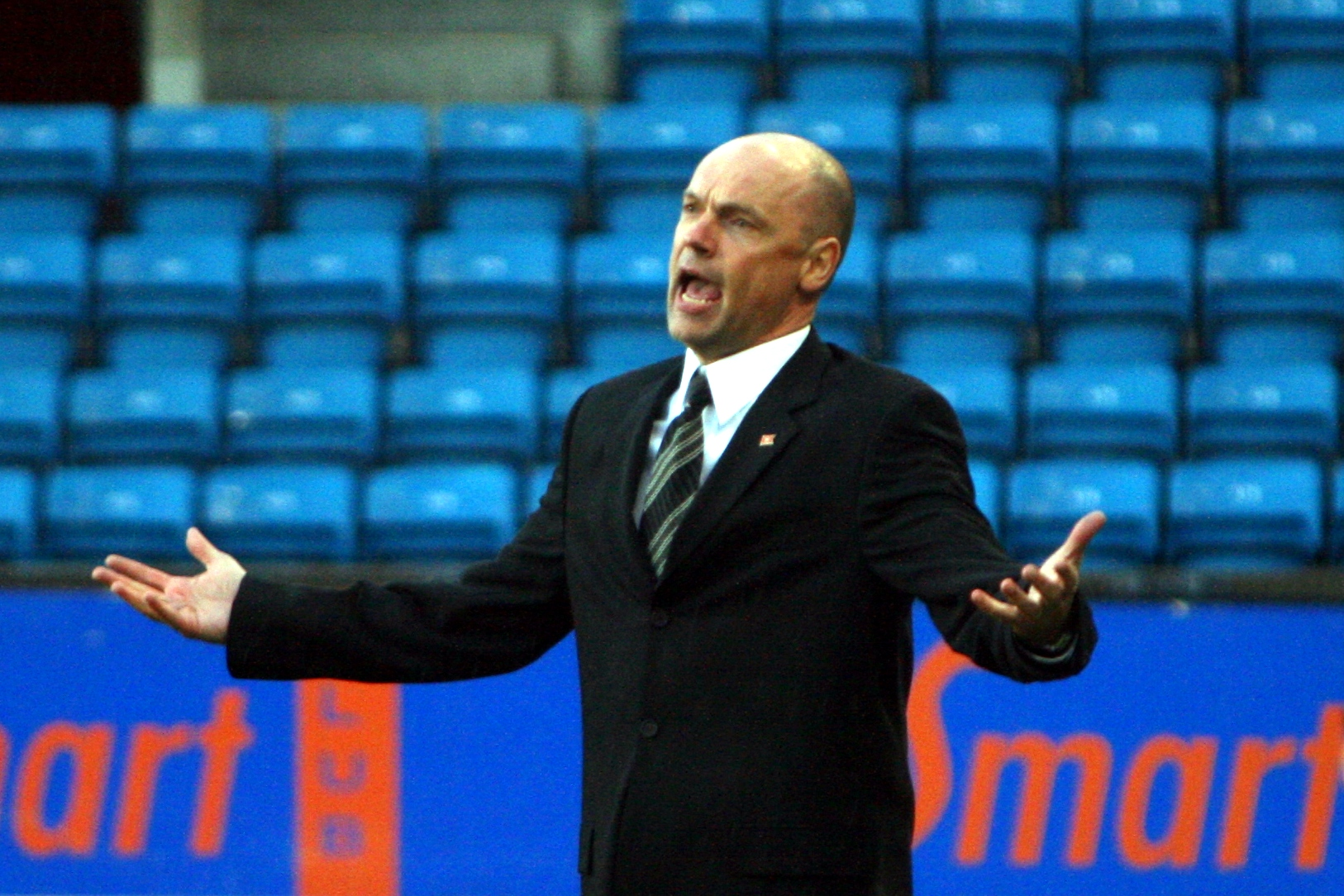
Uwe Rösler as manager for Viking on 13 April 2009 in a 0–0 draw against Lyn

After making a full recovery from lung cancer, he returned to Lillestrøm, and took the manager's seat in 2005. He led the team to two successive fourth-place finishes in the league, and also took them to the final of the Norwegian Cup in 2005 and the Royal League final in 2006, subsequently losing both. These results failed to satisfy the Lillestrøm board, and on 13 November 2006 he was sacked from his position along with assistant coach Gunnar Halle.

=== Viking ===
Rösler was appointed manager of Viking, another Norwegian team, on 22 November 2006, replacing Tom Nordlie, who took over Rösler's old job at Lillestrøm. In the 2007 season he led Viking to a third place in the Tippeligaen. On 18 November 2009 it was announced that Rösler was leaving Viking.

=== Molde ===
On 31 August 2010, he was hired by Molde on a short-term contract. During Molde's last eight games of the season, he doubled the team's total number of points, avoided a single defeat, and saved them from relegation. He was replaced by Ole Gunnar Solskjær in November 2010 ready for the start of the 2011 season.

=== Brentford ===
In November 2010, Rösler expressed his desire to return to the Premier League as a manager. In June 2011, he was appointed manager of League One side Brentford on an initial two-year contract.

Rösler's first game in charge was a practice match against Strømmen, which ended 0–0, while his first game open to fans was a 10–0 victory over Tonbridge Angels and his first competitive match in charge ended in a 2–0 win over Yeovil Town. Rösler had a successful first season managing at Brentford, finishing in ninth place with a total of 67 points, Brentford's highest league finish in six years.

In Rösler's second season in charge of Brentford they came within minutes of securing promotion from League One to the Championship. For their final game of the season, on 27 April 2013, they faced second placed Doncaster Rovers at Griffin Park, with Brentford in third place only a win would see his side promoted. In the dramatic final minute of added time and with the game poised at 0–0, Brentford won a penalty. On-loan striker Marcello Trotta insisted on taking the penalty rather than captain, Kevin O'Connor, hitting the crossbar. Doncaster counter-attacked from the rebound and James Coppinger scored the goal which guaranteed Doncaster's promotion as well as the league title. Brentford entered the play-offs, where they were drawn in the semi-final against Swindon Town.

Despite beating Swindon in an almost equally dramatic manner, eventually succeeding via a penalty shoot-out after a 4–4 aggregate scoreline. However promotion was never to come for Rösler's Brentford as they were beaten 2–1 in the play-off final by Yeovil Town at Wembley Stadium, after a poor first-half performance.

Following the drama and disappointment of the 2012–13 season, Rösler embarked upon a heavy overhaul of his squad in order to finally gain promotion to the Championship. In the summer transfer window, 13 players were either signed or loaned from other clubs whilst only three of last-season's first-team squad were sold. Rösler left the position of Brentford manager on 7 December 2013, having led a revival in the team's fortunes, winning seven of his final eight games. Under the stewardship of former sporting director Mark Warburton, the Bees achieved automatic promotion to the Championship on 18 April 2014. Long-serving player Kevin O'Connor paid tribute to Rösler at the end of the season, saying "Uwe got the ball rolling. We were a bang average League One side, but Uwe changed the mentality. Everything he did was all Premier League standard. He did amazing, so we’ll be saying thank you to him".

=== Wigan Athletic ===
On 7 December 2013, Rösler was appointed as the new manager of Championship side Wigan Athletic, taking over the position from Owen Coyle. His first game in charge came on 12 December 2013, a 2–1 loss against NK Maribor in the UEFA Europa League.

In March 2014, Rösler returned to Manchester City and led holders Wigan to a shock 2–1 victory over his old club at the Etihad Stadium in the quarter-final of the FA Cup. However, his team lost in the semi-finals to Arsenal at Wembley Stadium, 4–2 on penalties after a 1–1 draw. After finishing fifth in the Championship, Wigan qualified for the play-offs, but lost in the semi-final to eventual winners Queens Park Rangers after goals from Charlie Austin.

With Wigan being amongst the early favourites for promotion during the 2014–15 season, on 13 November 2014, Rösler was sacked by Wigan Athletic after the club fell into the relegation zone. The then Wigan chairman Dave Whelan proclaimed that despite sacking Rösler "I still rate him as a very, very good manager and I think he'll get another job very quickly and I wish him good luck" and Whelan revealed that it was a "harsh decision" to sack him after guiding Wigan to the Championship play-off semi-finals and FA Cup semi-finals months earlier. He was replaced as Wigan Athletic manager by Malky Mackay and then Gary Caldwell as the season ended with relegation.

=== Leeds United ===
On 20 May 2015, he was appointed as the head coach of Championship side Leeds United on a two-year deal. He had rejected a job offer from 1860 Munich in February 2015 in hopes of landing another job in England. As part of his backroom staff, he was joined at Leeds by assistant head coach Rob Kelly, goalkeeper coach Richard Hartis and first team coach Julian Darby. On 8 August, on the opening day of the Football League Championship season, Rösler's first game in charge ended in a 1–1 draw against Burnley after a goal from Mirco Antenucci. On 19 October, he was sacked after just two wins from 12 games in charge, following a 2–1 home defeat to Brighton & Hove Albion which left Leeds in 18th place in the Championship. On the same day, he was replaced as Leeds' head coach by former Rotherham manager Steve Evans.

=== Fleetwood Town ===
On 30 July 2016, four days before the start of the League One season, Rösler was appointed manager of League One side Fleetwood Town.

In Rösler's inaugural season at Fleetwood Town, he guided them to their highest ever points tally and finish in the club's history, finishing fourth with 82 points and reaching the League One play-offs where they were narrowly defeated by Bradford City (1–0 over two legs). From November 2016 to March 2017 the club went 18 games unbeaten, climbing from 13th to 2nd.

He was sacked on 17 February 2018 after seven straight defeats in all competitions.

=== Malmö FF ===
On 12 June 2018, Rösler was announced as the new head coach of Swedish title holders Malmö FF on a 2.5-year deal.

On 1 January 2020, Rösler resigned from Malmö after a two–year spell. After taking over midway through the 2018 campaign, he led the team from 11th to 3rd place. In his first full season, Malmö FF finished second in Allsvenskan (2019), losing the title by one point to Djurgården. Additionally, in his two seasons, he led the team into back-to-back Europa League knock-out stages, a first in the club's history.

=== Fortuna Düsseldorf ===
On 29 January 2020, Rösler was appointed as the new head coach of German Bundesliga side Fortuna Düsseldorf, who at the time were bottom of the table in 18th place. This was the first German club of his managerial career. While his team showed resilience with nine draws in 15 matches, they managed only two victories - wins against Freiburg and Schalke 04. The team ended the season with relegation after a 3–0 defeat at 1. FC Union Berlin on the final day.

Rösler remained in charge for the 2020–21 campaign in the 2. Bundesliga. Following the departure of 19 players, he oversaw a major overhaul of the first-team squad. Fortuna Düsseldorf finished the season in fifth place, narrowly missing out on the play-off spot on the final matchday. His contract was not extended after the 2020–21 season.

=== AGF ===
On 14 June 2022, Rösler was appointed as the new head coach for the Danish Superliga team AGF on a three-year contract. He took over a team that had narrowly avoided relegation the previous season.

In his first campaign (2022–23), AGF finished third in the league, securing a bronze medal and achieving record player sales. In the following seasons, the club reached the Danish Cup final and finished fifth (2023–24) and sixth (2024–25). This marked the first time since 1995–1997 that AGF had qualified for the championship round (top six) in three consecutive years.

During Rösler’s tenure, AGF also engaged in major infrastructure investments, including the establishment of a new youth academy, the construction of a temporary stadium, and the commencement of work on a new permanent stadium.

Uwe Rosler was replaced by Jakob Poulsen on the 31st of May.

=== VfL Bochum ===
In October 2025, he was appointed as the new head coach of VfL Bochum.

== Managerial style ==
Rösler is renowned for his teams playing a high, pressing style of football, and is also a fan of squad rotation among players, with 4–3–3 or 3–5–2 his favoured formations. Rösler compared his style and brand of football similar to the philosophies of German compatriot Jürgen Klopp, with Rösler describing the style of football as 'heavy metal' attacking football, with powerful quick football with quick transitions from attack to defence.

== Personal life ==
Born and brought up in East Germany as the communist regime was collapsing, during his time at Lokomotive Leipzig, Rösler was interviewed by the Stasi secret police organisation, who attempted to force him to inform on colleagues seeking to defect to the West in exchange for the Stasi allowing him to continue his fledgling football career unimpeded – only the furious intervention of his manager saved him from their attentions.

Having been a fan of English football from his childhood, Rösler said that he found his "home" in England during his time with Manchester City, and described the formation of his bond with the City fans as the "biggest achievement in my career". Diagnosed with non-Hodgkin lymphoma in 2003, he credited his recovery to the support of the fans of the club, and said that hearing them sing his name at a game while he lay in hospital made his bond with the club "unbreakable". Rösler has stated on several occasions that his ambition for his managerial career is to eventually become manager of the Manchester club.

Rösler has a Norwegian wife, with whom he has had two sons. His eldest son is named Colin after Colin Bell, and is a professional footballer for Malmö FF, while his second son is named Tony after Tony Book – both Bell and Book are former Manchester City players and are considered club legends.

In 2013, Rösler's autobiography Knocking Down Walls was released.

== Career statistics ==
=== Club ===
Appearances and goals by club, season and competition
| Club | Season | League | | | National Cup | | League Cup | | Europe | | Total | |
| Club | Season | Division | Apps | Goals | Apps | Goals | Apps | Goals | Apps | Goals | Apps | Goals |
|---|---|---|---|---|---|---|---|---|---|---|---|---|
| Lokomotive Leipzig | 1987–88 | DDR-Oberliga | 3 | 0 | 1 | 0 | – | | 2 | 0 | 6 | 0 |
| BSG Chemie Leipzig | 1987–88 | DDR-Liga | 10 | 2 | | | – | | – | | 10 | 2 |
| BSG Chemie Leipzig | 1988–89 | DDR-Liga | 17 | 4 | | | – | | – | | 17 | 4 |
| BSG Chemie Leipzig | Total | | 27 | 6 | | | — | | | | 27 | 6 |
| 1. FC Magdeburg | 1988–89 | DDR-Oberliga | 9 | 3 | | | – | | – | | 9 | 3 |
| 1. FC Magdeburg | 1989–90 | DDR-Oberliga | 24 | 11 | | | – | | – | | 24 | 11 |
| 1. FC Magdeburg | 1990–91 | NOFV-Oberliga | 13 | 5 | | | – | | 4 | 0 | 17 | 5 |
| 1. FC Magdeburg | Total | | 46 | 19 | | | — | | 4 | 0 | 50 | 19 |
| Dynamo Dresden | 1990–91 | NOFV-Oberliga | 13 | 3 | | | – | | 2 | 0 | 15 | 3 |
| Dynamo Dresden | 1991–92 | Bundesliga | 33 | 4 | 3 | 2 | – | | – | | 36 | 6 |
| Dynamo Dresden | Total | | 46 | 7 | 3 | 2 | — | | 2 | 0 | 51 | 9 |
| 1. FC Nürnberg | 1992–93 | Bundesliga | 28 | 0 | 3 | 3 | – | | – | | 31 | 3 |
| Dynamo Dresden (loan) | 1993–94 | Bundesliga | 7 | 0 | 1 | 0 | – | | – | | 8 | 0 |
| Manchester City | 1993–94 | Premier League | 12 | 5 | 0 | 0 | 0 | 0 | – | | 12 | 5 |
| Manchester City | 1994–95 | Premier League | 31 | 15 | 4 | 5 | 3 | 2 | – | | 38 | 22 |
| Manchester City | 1995–96 | Premier League | 36 | 9 | 5 | 2 | 3 | 2 | – | | 44 | 13 |
| Manchester City | 1996–97 | Division One | 44 | 15 | 3 | 1 | 2 | 1 | – | | 49 | 17 |
| Manchester City | 1997–98 | Division One | 29 | 6 | 2 | 1 | 2 | 0 | – | | 33 | 7 |
| Manchester City | Total | | 152 | 50 | 14 | 9 | 10 | 5 | — | | 176 | 64 |
| 1. FC Kaiserslautern | 1998–99 | Bundesliga | 28 | 8 | 2 | 1 | 1 | 0 | 6 | 3 | 37 | 12 |
| Tennis Borussia Berlin | 1999–2000 | 2. Bundesliga | 28 | 6 | 2 | 3 | – | | – | | 30 | 9 |
| Southampton | 2000–01 | Premier League | 20 | 0 | 2 | 0 | 2 | 1 | – | | 24 | 1 |
| Southampton | 2001–02 | Premier League | 4 | 0 | 0 | 0 | 1 | 0 | – | | 5 | 0 |
| Southampton | Total | | 24 | 0 | 2 | 0 | 3 | 1 | — | | 29 | 1 |
| West Bromwich Albion | 2001–02 | Division One | 5 | 1 | 0 | 0 | 0 | 0 | – | | 5 | 1 |
| SpVgg Unterhaching | 2001–02 | 2. Bundesliga | 14 | 5 | 0 | 0 | – | | – | | 14 | 5 |
| Lillestrøm | 2002 | Tippeligaen | 10 | 9 | 0 | 0 | – | | 2 | 0 | 12 | 9 |
| Lillestrøm | 2003 | Tippeligaen | 1 | 1 | 0 | 0 | – | | – | | 1 | 1 |
| Lillestrøm | Total | | 11 | 10 | 0 | 0 | — | | 2 | 0 | 13 | 10 |
| Career total | | | 419 | 112 | 28 | 18 | 14 | 6 | 16 | 3 | 477 | 139 |

=== Managerial ===
As of match played 21 November 2026

Managerial record by team and tenure
| Team | From | To | Record | | | | |
| Team | From | To | P | W | D | L | Win % |
|---|---|---|---|---|---|---|---|
| Lillestrøm | 1 November 2004 | 13 November 2006 | 56 | 25 | 16 | 15 | 44.6 |
| Viking | 22 November 2006 | 18 November 2009 | 89 | 37 | 24 | 28 | 41.6 |
| Molde | 30 August 2010 | 31 December 2010 | 8 | 6 | 2 | 0 | 75.0 |
| Brentford | 10 June 2011 | 7 December 2013 | 136 | 60 | 40 | 36 | 44.1 |
| Wigan Athletic | 7 December 2013 | 13 November 2014 | 55 | 22 | 16 | 17 | 40.0 |
| Leeds United | 20 May 2015 | 19 October 2015 | 12 | 2 | 6 | 4 | 16.7 |
| Fleetwood Town | 30 July 2016 | 17 February 2018 | 102 | 43 | 26 | 33 | 42.2 |
| Malmö FF | 12 June 2018 | 13 December 2019 | 83 | 51 | 22 | 10 | 61.4 |
| Fortuna Düsseldorf | 29 January 2020 | 30 June 2021 | 53 | 20 | 18 | 15 | 37.7 |
| AGF | 14 June 2022 | 31 May 2025 | 112 | 46 | 30 | 36 | 41.1 |
| VfL Bochum | 6 October 2025 | Present | 42 | 17 | 13 | 12 | 40.5 |
| Total | | | 748 | 329 | 213 | 206 | 44.0 |

== Honours ==
Individual

- League One Manager of the Month: November 2013, January 2017
