= Richard Hartis =

English association football coach

Richard Hartis (born 16 September 1967) is an English coach, who is currently the goalkeeping coach for Turkish club Beşiktaş. He was previously the goalkeeping coach of the Jamaican National Football Team.

== Coaching career ==
From 1987 to 1990, he was the youth goalkeeping coach at Sheffield United. He then proceeded to work at Mercyhurst College for six years, three years as head coach for the Men's and Women's teams from 1994 to 1997.

In three seasons under Hartis, the men's team made the NCAA Division II Final Four once and the Elite Eight once. During his tenure with the Women's program, they made the NCAA tournament two out of three years.

Hartis then returned to England in 1997 to become goalkeeping coach at Leeds United Academy. He remained at Leeds until the summer of 2000, having worked with all academy ages including the reserves. He left Leeds to join former Leeds United Academy staff Alan Hill, Steve Beaglehole and Daral Pugh at Leicester City as head academy goalkeeping coach. Hartis remained at Leicester for only one season, before joining Manchester United as head academy goalkeeping coach. Hartis also become acting first-team goalkeeping coach during Manchester United's double run in 2007–08, working with goalkeepers Edwin van der Sar, Ben Foster, Tomasz Kuszczak and Tom Heaton. He spent ten years at Manchester United before leaving.

In January 2011, he was appointed to first-team goalkeeping coach at Norwegian Club Molde as part of the staff of Ole Gunnar Solskjær. He remained there at Molde for three years.

On 2 January 2014, Hartis was appointed first-team goalkeeping coach at Cardiff City as part of Ole Gunnar Solskjær's coaching team. He left Cardiff along with Ole Gunnar Solskjær in September 2014.

On 9 June 2015, he was unveiled as the new goalkeeping coach for Leeds United as part of Uwe Rösler's new backroom team.

On 21 April 2016, Hartis joined The FA as a national goalkeeping coach for the professional development phase (U18 to U20), eventually going on to be a member of the England coaching staff that lifted the 2017 FIFA U-20 World Cup.

On 22 June 2019, Hartis re-joined Manchester United as senior goalkeeping coach. He left in July 2024, after five years at the club, as a part of new ownership overhaul.

He joined the coaching team for the men's Jamaican national team in July 2024, continuing his working relationship with manager Steve McClaren, who had been part of the coaching staff with him at Manchester United.
