= Carl Griffiths =

English-born Welsh footballer

Personal information
- Full name: Carl Brian Griffiths
- Date of birth: 16 July 1971 (age 55)
- Place of birth: Oswestry, England
- Height: 5 ft 10 in (1.78 m)
- Position: Forward

Senior career*
Years	Team	Apps	(Gls)
1988–1993	Shrewsbury Town	143	(54)
1993–1995	Manchester City	18	(4)
1995–1996	Portsmouth	14	(2)
1996–1997	Peterborough United	16	(2)
1996	→ Leyton Orient (loan)	5	(3)
1997–1999	Leyton Orient	65	(29)
1999	→ Wrexham (loan)	4	(3)
1999	Port Vale	8	(1)
1999–2001	Leyton Orient	48	(18)
2001–2003	Luton Town	13	(8)
2003	Harlow Town		
2004–200?	Braintree Town		
2006–2007	Brentwood Town		
2007	Maldon Town		
2010	Barkingside		
Total		334	(124)

International career
- Wales under-21
- Wales B

Managerial career
- 2008–2009: Brentwood Town
- 2010–2011: Aveley
- * Club domestic league appearances and goals

Carl Brian Griffiths (born 16 July 1971) is an English-born Welsh former footballer and manager.

He started his career with Shrewsbury Town in 1988, and after being voted onto the PFA Team of the Year, moved on to Manchester City for £500,000 in October 1993. In August 1995 he transferred to Portsmouth for £200,000, moving on to Peterborough United for £225,000 in March 1996. He joined Leyton Orient for £65,000 in March 1997, where he stayed for four years, interrupted by short spells at Wrexham (on loan) and Port Vale. He played for Luton Town between July 2001 and 2003 following a £65,000 transfer, later dropping into non-League football with Harlow Town, Braintree Town, Brentwood Town, and Maldon Town. He also represented Wales at under-21 level and also for the "B" team. Within his three spells with Leyton Orient he achieved cult status and in 2004 received 9% of the vote for all-time cult hero behind Peter Kitchen and Terry Howard.

In 2008, he turned to management and took charge of Brentwood Town for a year. In 2010, he was made manager of Aveley before leaving this post the following year.

== Playing career ==
Griffiths started his career with Shrewsbury Town in September 1988 under the stewardship of Ian McNeill. The "Shrews" were relegated out of the Second Division in 1988–89 after finishing five points behind Hull City. They finished 11th in the Third Division in 1989–90 and 18th in 1990–91 under Asa Hartford, before suffering relegation under new boss John Bond in 1991–92 after finishing six points behind 20th place Exeter City, a team they had beaten 6–1 early in the campaign. He scored 27 goals in 1992–93 to become joint-top scorer (with Darren Foreman) in the Third Division. He was named to the PFA Team of the Year for this achievement. Hitting 62 goals in 170 games during a difficult period at the Gay Meadow, he had done enough to be picked up by Brian Horton's Manchester City in October 1993 for a fee of £500,000. He scored four goals in 18 Premier League games in 1993–94 and 1994–95.

He was moved on to Portsmouth as a £200,000 make-weight in the Kit Symons transfer in August 1995. He was utilized almost exclusively as a substitute by manager Terry Fenwick, making just two starts in 1995–96. He moved on to Peterborough United for £225,000 in March 1996. The "Posh" avoided relegation in 1995–96 by a three-point margin. Peterborough could not avoid relegation out of the Second Division in 1996–97, though Griffiths had already arrived back in the Third Division after spending November 1996 on loan at Leyton Orient. Scoring three goals in five games was enough to convince Tommy Taylor to spend £100,000 to bring him to Brisbane Road permanently in March 1997. He found his form with the "O's", and finished as the fifth highest scorer in the Third Division in 1997–98 with 18 league goals. This tally included a hat-trick in an 8–0 demolition of Doncaster Rovers on 28 December. He hit nine goals in 31 games to fire Orient into the play-offs in 1998–99. However, he could not feature in the play-off final, as he had already left the club. He spent four weeks on loan at Wrexham from 14 January 1999 and found the net in four of his five appearances for Brian Flynn's "Dragons".

He moved to Port Vale in March 1999 for £100,000 as part of new manager Brian Horton's spending spree. Making just three appearances in 1998–99, he played just seven times in 1999–2000, and returned to former club Leyton Orient for £100,000 in December 1999. He scored four times in eleven games in 1999–2000, including a hat-trick in a 5–1 win over Chester at the Deva Stadium on 28 December. He returned to form in 2000–01, hitting 19 goals in 43 appearances to fire Orient into the play-offs, though he did not feature in the play-off final defeat to Blackpool. In July 2001, he was sold to Joe Kinnear's Luton Town for £65,000. He scored a hat-trick of headers in a 5–1 win over Torquay United at Kenilworth Road on 22 September 2001. However, injuries limited him to just ten appearances in 2001–02 and three appearances in 2002–03. Griffiths then moved into non-League football with Harlow Town, Brentwood Town and Braintree Town. In November 2010, at the age of 39, Griffiths was still playing, and scoring, for Barkingside of the Essex Senior League.

== Management career ==
On 24 May 2008, Griffiths was appointed manager of Brentwood Town. He left the club after one season, despite the chairman's open pleas for him to stay. He later was appointed assistant manager at Barkingside of the Essex Senior League.

On 19 November 2010, Aveley announced that Griffiths had been appointed manager of the club with immediate effect and would bring together his ex-management team from Brentwood, consisting of Scott Canham, Gary Foley, Harry McCullum and Dean Parratt. He left Aveley in November 2011.

== Career statistics ==
Appearances and goals by club, season and competition
Club	Season	League			FA Cup		Other		Total	
Club	Season	Division	Apps	Goals	Apps	Goals	Apps	Goals	Apps	Goals
Shrewsbury Town	1988–89	Second Division	28	6	1	0	1	0	30	6
Shrewsbury Town	1989–90	Third Division	18	4	1	0	4	0	23	4
Shrewsbury Town	1990–91	Third Division	19	4	0	0	3	1	22	5
Shrewsbury Town	1991–92	Third Division	27	8	1	0	4	1	32	9
Shrewsbury Town	1992–93	Third Division	42	27	3	2	3	2	48	31
Shrewsbury Town	1993–94	Third Division	9	5	0	0	6	2	15	7
Shrewsbury Town	Total		143	54	6	2	21	6	170	62
Manchester City	1993–94	Premier League	16	4	2	0	0	0	18	4
Manchester City	1994–95	Premier League	2	0	0	0	1	0	3	0
Manchester City	Total		18	4	2	0	1	0	21	4
Portsmouth	1995–96	First Division	14	2	0	0	1	0	15	2
Peterborough United	1995–96	Second Division	4	1	0	0	0	0	4	1
Peterborough United	1996–97	Second Division	12	1	2	1	3	1	17	3
Peterborough United	Total		16	2	2	1	3	1	21	4
Leyton Orient	1996–97	Third Division	13	6	0	0	0	0	13	6
Leyton Orient	1997–98	Third Division	33	18	2	0	6	3	41	21
Leyton Orient	1998–99	Third Division	24	8	3	1	4	0	31	9
Leyton Orient	Total		70	32	5	1	10	3	85	36
Wrexham	1998–99	Second Division	4	3	0	0	1	1	5	4
Port Vale	1998–99	First Division	3	1	0	0	0	0	3	1
Port Vale	1999–2000	First Division	5	0	0	0	2	1	7	1
Port Vale	Total		8	1	0	0	2	1	10	2
Leyton Orient	1999–2000	Third Division	11	4	0	0	0	0	11	4
Leyton Orient	2000–01	Third Division	37	14	3	4	3	0	43	18
Leyton Orient	Total		48	18	3	4	3	0	54	22
Luton Town	2001–02	Third Division	10	7	0	0	1	0	11	7
Luton Town	2002–03	Second Division	3	1	0	0	0	0	3	1
Luton Town	Total		13	8	0	0	1	0	14	8
Career total			334	124	18	8	43	12	395	144

== Honours ==
Individual

- PFA Team of the Year (Third Division): 1992–93
