= Damien Whitehead =

English footballer (born 1979)

Personal information
- Full name: Damien Stephen Whitehead
- Date of birth: 24 April 1979 (age 47)
- Place of birth: Whiston, Merseyside, England
- Position: Striker

Senior career*
Years	Team	Apps	(Gls)
1998–1999	Warrington Town	32	(38)
1999–2002	Macclesfield Town	57	(14)
2002	Drogheda United	10	(6)
2002–2003	Leigh RMI	10	(0)
2003	Northwich Victoria	4	(0)
2003	Leigh RMI	9	(0)
2003	Finn Harps	24	(16)
2004	Omagh Town	12	(4)
2005	Institute	14	(6)
2005–2006	Newry City	22	(8)
2006–2008	Coleraine	34	(14)
- * Club domestic league appearances and goals

Damien Whitehead (born 24 April 1979) is an English former professional footballer who played in The Football League for Macclesfield Town.

== Career ==
Whitehead started his career at non-league Warrington Town where his impressive goal scoring attracted the attentions of Macclesfield Town who signed him for a small fee. After scoring 14 goals in 57 appearances (20 starts, 37 sub) for the Silkmen he left and played semi-pro football in both the Republic of Ireland and Northern Ireland.

He signed for Drogheda United initially on a one-month deal in January 2002. He made his League of Ireland debut on 7 January at Whitehall Stadium. After spells at Drogheda and Finn Harps in the south, he went on to play for Omagh Town, Newry and Coleraine in the north.

== Honours ==
- League of Ireland First Division:
  - Drogheda United - 2001-02
