= Mike Bamber (footballer) =

English footballer

Personal information
- Date of birth: 1 October 1980 (age 46)
- Place of birth: Preston, Lancashire, England
- Position: Defender

Youth career
- 1999: Blackpool

Senior career*
Years	Team	Apps	(Gls)
1999–2002	Macclesfield Town	6	(0)
- * Club domestic league appearances and goals

Mike Bamber (born 1 October 1980) is an English footballer who played in The Football League for Macclesfield Town.
