= Kieron Durkan =

English-Irish footballer

Personal information
- Full name: Kieron John Durkan
- Date of birth: 1 December 1973
- Place of birth: Chester, England
- Date of death: 28 February 2018 (aged 44)
- Height: 5 ft 11 in (1.80 m)
- Position: Midfielder

Youth career
- –1992: Wrexham

Senior career*
| Years | Team | Apps | (Gls) |
| 1992–1996 | Wrexham | 50 | (4) |
| 1996–1998 | Stockport County | 65 | (4) |
| 1998–2001 | Macclesfield Town | 102 | (13) |
| 2000 | → York City (loan) | 7 | (0) |
| 2001–2003 | Rochdale | 30 | (1) |
| 2003–2004 | Swansea City | 21 | (1) |
| 2004 | Caernarfon Town | 3 | (0) |
| 2005 | Cefn Druids | 3 | (0) |
| Total | | 275 | (22) |

International career
| | Republic of Ireland U21 | 5 | (0) |
- * Club domestic league appearances and goals

Kieron John Durkan (1 December 1973 – 28 February 2018) was a professional footballer who played as a midfielder. Active between 1992 and 2004, Durkan made over 250 appearances in the Football League. Born in England, he represented the Republic of Ireland at youth international level.

== Early and personal life ==
Durkan was born in Chester, Cheshire and raised in nearby Runcorn.

== Club career ==
He played professionally for Wrexham, Stockport County, Macclesfield Town, York City, Rochdale and Swansea City. Durkan later played non-League football for Caernarfon Town, Runcorn FC Halton, Leek Town and Cefn Druids.

== International career ==
He earned five caps for the Republic of Ireland national under-21 team.

== Later life and death ==
After retiring Durkan worked as a Police Community Support Officer. He died by suicide on 28 February 2018 at the age of 44.
