= Steve Lomas =

Northern Irish footballer and manager (born 1974)

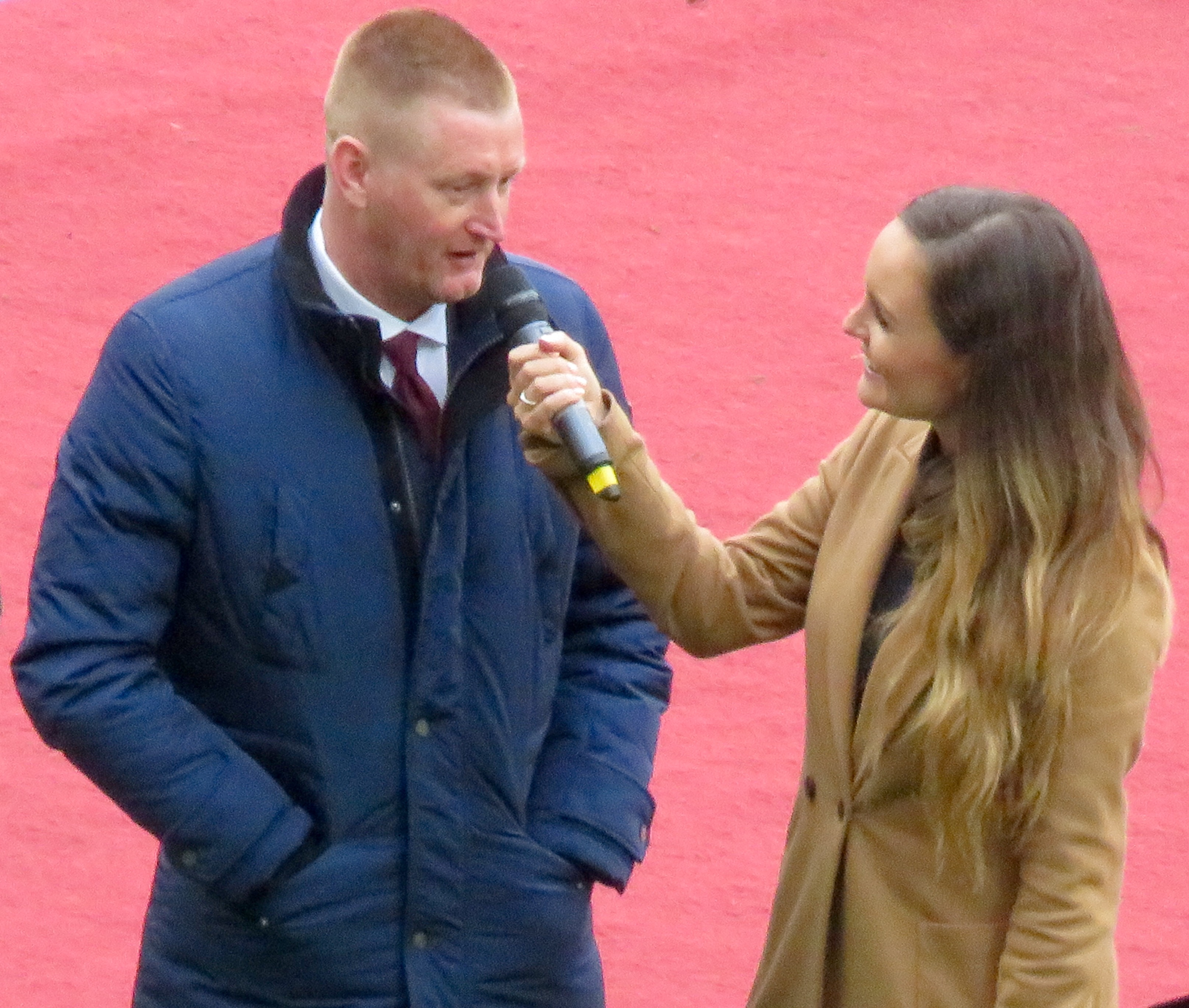
- Lomas being interviewed in 2018

Personal information
- Full name: Stephen Martin Lomas
- Date of birth: 18 January 1974 (age 52)
- Place of birth: Hanover, West Germany
- Height: 6 ft 0 in (1.83 m)
- Position: Midfielder

Senior career*
Years	Team	Apps	(Gls)
1991–1997	Manchester City	111	(8)
1997–2005	West Ham United	187	(10)
2005–2007	Queens Park Rangers	55	(2)
2007–2008	Gillingham	8	(0)
2009–2010	St Neots Town		
Total		361	(20)

International career
1994–2003	Northern Ireland	45	(3)

Managerial career
- 2009–2010: St Neots Town
- 2011–2013: St Johnstone
- 2013: Millwall
- * Club domestic league appearances and goals

Stephen Martin Lomas (born 18 January 1974) is a Northern Irish football manager and former professional footballer.

As a player, Lomas was a midfielder from 1991 to 2010. He had spells in the Premier League for both Manchester City and West Ham United before moving into the Football League with Queens Park Rangers and Gillingham. In 2009, he became player-manager of Non-league side St Neots Town. Lomas was capped 45 times by Northern Ireland, scoring 3 goals.

Lomas was appointed manager of Scottish Premier League club St Johnstone in 2011. He guided them to UEFA Europa League qualification places in 2011–12 and 2012–13. He moved to Championship club Millwall in June 2013.

== Club career ==
Lomas, a midfielder, first made his name with Manchester City after joining them in 1991. He soon broke into the first team but will often be remembered at the club for his misfortune of scoring an own goal on the last day of the 1995–96 season, which meant that City could only manage a 2–2 draw at home to Liverpool and were relegated from the Premier League on goal difference.

He then moved to West Ham United in 1997 for a fee of £2.5 million. He made his West Ham debut on 9 April 1997 in a 0–0 draw with Middlesbrough; his first goal coming on 3 December 1997 in a 4–1 defeat of Crystal Palace. He made 227 competitive appearances, scoring 13 goals, became club captain and was a member of the West Ham team which won the Intertoto Cup in 1999.

On 31 August 2005, he was released on a free transfer and joined Queens Park Rangers. Whilst at QPR he was named captain on occasions and his experience helped Rangers move away from the relegation zone.

He left QPR in May 2007, and joined Gillingham on 31 July 2007. On 9 January 2008, Gillingham manager Mark Stimson revealed that Lomas had been placed on the transfer list. On 31 January it was announced that Lomas had been released from his contract.

== International career ==
Lomas was born in Hanover, West Germany, his father was a soldier stationed there. As a child he briefly lived in Hong Kong, before moving to Coleraine, Northern Ireland at the age of two. He earned 45 caps for the Northern Ireland national team, scoring three goals.

== Managerial career ==
After leaving Gillingham, Lomas took up a coaching role at Norwich City before managing St Neots Town. from 23 March 2009, until July 2010, leading the club to their most successful season for 40 years. He left the club briefly in January 2010, following the departure of chairman John Delaney, but returned after Delaney had been reinstated as Chairman. Lomas resigned from St Neots in July 2010 to pursue his ambition to manage at a league club. At the end of February 2011 he accepted the position of reserve team manager at West Ham United.

=== St Johnstone ===
In November 2011, Lomas signed a 2 1/2-year deal to manage Scottish Premier League side St Johnstone following the departure of Derek McInnes to English Championship team Bristol City. Shortly after signing the deal to become first team manager he was joined by former Northern Ireland goalkeeper and Lisburn Distillery manager Tommy Wright who had agreed to join the club as an assistant to Lomas. In his first season as manager of St Johnstone, Lomas took the club to a top 6 finish for the first time since 1999.

On 4 October 2012, Lomas was named SPL Manager of the month, the first time a St Johnstone manager had won the award. On beating the Manager of the Month "curse" in October to record fifth- and sixth-straight wins against St Mirren and Kilmarnock, Lomas achieved the best run of results at St Johnstone since 1971, reaching second place in the SPL table behind Celtic.

In October 2012, Lomas' name began to be linked with vacant manager's positions at English clubs; first at Bournemouth, then Burnley, Fleetwood, Doncaster Rovers and Coventry City.

Lomas achieved a second-successive top six SPL finish with a game to spare, and in the last game of the season, on 19 May 2013, in his first full season in charge, a 2–0 victory over Motherwell gave St Johnstone third place in the SPL and Europa League qualification.

=== Millwall ===
On 5 June 2013, Millwall made an official approach to speak with Lomas about the vacant managerial position. His appointment as manager was announced on 6 June. Lomas was sacked on 26 December 2013 after the ten men of Millwall lost to Watford. Lomas' tenure at Millwall had been up and down. He had won six of 24 games as manager of Millwall but these included wins against higher-placed teams such as Blackpool, Leeds and Wigan and he was nominated for the September SkyBet Championship Manager of the Month award after winning three games in a row. Lomas had also drawn six including QPR, Burnley, Reading and Nottingham Forest. Inheriting a team which finished one point above the relegation places on the last day of the 2012–13 season, however, Lomas was unable to achieve a dramatic turnaround in performance and left with the club one place above that in 20th position and four points above the relegation places.

== Personal life ==
He is a nephew of the former Manchester United and Northern Ireland goalkeeper Harry Gregg.

== Honours ==
Player

West Ham United

- UEFA Intertoto Cup: 1999

Manager

St Neots Town

- Hunts Senior Cup: 2009–10
- Hinchingbrooke Cup: 2008–09

== Managerial statistics ==
As of 26 December 2013

Managerial record by team and tenure
Team	From	To	Record				
Team	From	To	P	W	D	L	Win %
St Johnstone	3 November 2011	6 June 2013	73	27	20	26	37.0
Millwall	6 June 2013	26 December 2013	24	6	6	12	25.0
Total			97	33	26	38	34.0
