= John Foster (footballer) =

English footballer

Personal information
- Full name: John Colin Foster
- Date of birth: 19 September 1973 (age 53)
- Place of birth: Blackley, England
- Position: Full back

Youth career
- –1992: Manchester City

Senior career*
Years	Team	Apps	(Gls)
1992–1998	Manchester City	33	(0)
1998	Carlisle United	10	(0)
1998–1999	Bury	7	(0)
1999–2002	Hyde United	87	(1)
2002–2003	Mossley	19	(2)
2003–2004	Trafford	38	(2)
2004–2005	Radcliffe Borough	18	(0)
2005	Salford City		

Managerial career
- 2005: Salford City
- * Club domestic league appearances and goals

John Colin Foster (born 19 September 1973) is an English football manager and former professional footballer who played as a defender.

== Career ==
Foster began his career with Manchester City, playing several season in the Premier League. He later played in the Football League for Carlisle United and Bury before turning out at non-league level with Hyde United, Mossley, Trafford, Radcliffe Borough and Salford City. He spent a brief spell in charge of Salford in 2005.
