= Andy Dibble =

Welsh footballer and coach (born 1965)

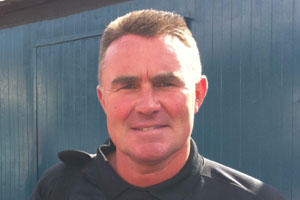

Personal information
- Full name: Andrew Gerald Dibble
- Date of birth: 8 May 1965 (age 61)
- Place of birth: Cwmbran, Wales
- Height: 6 ft 2 in (1.88 m)
- Position: Goalkeeper

Team information
- Current team: Accrington Stanley (Head of Goalkeeping)

Senior career*
Years	Team	Apps	(Gls)
1982–1984	Cardiff City	62	(0)
1984–1988	Luton Town	30	(0)
1986	→ Sunderland (loan)	12	(0)
1987	→ Huddersfield Town (loan)	5	(0)
1988–1997	Manchester City	116	(0)
1990	→ Aberdeen (loan)	5	(0)
1991	→ Middlesbrough (loan)	19	(0)
1991	→ Bolton Wanderers (loan)	13	(0)
1992	→ West Bromwich Albion (loan)	9	(0)
1997	→ Sheffield United (loan)	0	(0)
1997	Rangers	7	(0)
1997	Sheffield United	0	(0)
1997	Luton Town	1	(0)
1998	Middlesbrough	2	(0)
1998	Altrincham	12	(0)
1998	Barry Town	1	(0)
1999–2000	Hartlepool United	6	(0)
1999	→ Carlisle United (loan)	2	(0)
2000–2002	Stockport County	23	(0)
2002–2005	Wrexham	83	(0)
2005–2006	Accrington Stanley	1	(0)
Total		397	(0)

International career
1986–1989	Wales	3	(0)
- * Club domestic league appearances and goals

Andrew Gerald Dibble (born 8 May 1965) is a Welsh football coach and former professional player.

As a player, he was as a goalkeeper from 1982 to 2006. During his career, he played in the Premier League for Manchester City and in the Scottish Premier Division for Aberdeen and Rangers. He also played in the Football League for Cardiff City, Luton Town, Huddersfield Town, Sunderland, Middlesbrough, Bolton Wanderers, West Bromwich Albion, Sheffield United, Hartlepool United, Carlisle United, Stockport County and Wrexham. He also played in the Welsh Premier League for Barry Town, and in non-league football with Altrincham and Accrington Stanley. A journeyman, Dibble won three caps for the Wales national football team.

After retiring, Dibble moved into coaching and has previously worked on the coaching staff at Accrington Stanley, Coventry City, Peterborough United, Rotherham United and Cardiff City.

== Playing career ==
=== Early career ===
Dibble began his career at Cardiff City, joining as an apprentice in June 1981 and turning professional in August 1982. He made his first team debut on his 17th birthday in a 1–0 defeat to Crystal Palace. The following season, he established himself as the club's first choice goalkeeper helping the side to promotion and the next year he missed just one league match. His performances at the club alerted a number of clubs and he moved to Luton Town for £125,000 in July 1984. During his time there he twice went out on loan, firstly to Sunderland in 1986 and then to Huddersfield Town in 1987. Arguably the finest moment of his career was saving a Nigel Winterburn penalty in the 1988 League Cup final at Wembley, as Luton beat Arsenal 3–2 to win their first major trophy. Luton were 2–1 down with only ten minutes of the game left when Dibble, standing in for the injured Les Sealey, made the save, as well as a string of other saves to keep Luton in the game, allowing them to score two late goals and win the match 3–2.

=== Manchester City ===
Dibble moved on to Manchester City in July 1988 for a £240,000 fee (2009: £419,000). His time at City was interrupted by injuries, and despite being virtually ever-present during his first two seasons, subsequently found himself second choice behind Tony Coton and arguably even third choice when youngster Martyn Margetson broke through onto the senior scene. Dibble was loaned out to several teams (namely Aberdeen, Middlesbrough, Bolton Wanderers, West Bromwich Albion and Sheffield United), and only very rarely played first team football for the Manchester team after his first two seasons.

In his time at Manchester City, Dibble was on the receiving end in a notorious incident in a game against Nottingham Forest in March 1990 when Gary Crosby headed the ball out of Dibble's hand before putting it into the City goal. The goal stood and Forest won the game 1–0.

=== Later career ===
Dibble moved to Rangers on a free transfer in March 1997. He had a baptism of fire in a tempestuous and crucial Old Firm derby, standing in for the injured Andy Goram. He kept a clean sheet in the 1–0 victory which helped seal Rangers' ninth consecutive title.

After a trial at Middlesbrough in July 1997 he moved back to former club Luton Town on a free transfer, before re-joining Middlesbrough in January 1998, again for no fee, however it was a disastrous move for Dibble as he let in nine goals in just two games, four in a 4–0 defeat to Nottingham Forest and another five in a 5–0 loss to QPR. In July 1998 Dibble signed for Altrincham, before a brief spell at League of Wales side Barry Town. In December 1998, whilst playing for Barry against Carmarthen Town, he was hospitalised after suffering chemical burns as a result of diving on the Richmond Park pitch markings. Scarred for life, he received £20,000 in damages. In March 1999 he signed for Hartlepool United, who loaned him to Carlisle United in October of the same year. He joined Stockport County in August 2000, enjoying a successful spell there and being named man of the match in many of the games he played.

Dibble signed for Wrexham in May 2002, and despite suffering injury problems in his time in North Wales, he was a major part in Wrexham gaining promotion back to Division Two at the first time of asking in 2002–03. In March 2004 he broke his arm in a 6–1 defeat at Peterborough and missed the remainder of the season, while in September of the following season he was out for three months after severing tendons in his finger. He suffered a further injury later in the season when a torn thigh muscle ruled him out for the rest of the campaign. Dibble was released by Wrexham in May 2005.

== Coaching career ==
He finished his career at Accrington Stanley (whom he joined in 2005) and became their goalkeeping coach. In November 2006 he moved to Coventry City to take up the same role. However, he lasted only three months in this position at Coventry, he left the club, along with Adrian Heath, prior to the announcement that Iain Dowie would be the club's new manager following the dismissal of Micky Adams. On 9 March 2007 he was appointed as goalkeeping coach at League One side Peterborough United. In October 2009 he left Peterborough by mutual consent to take up the goalkeeping coach position at Rotherham United.

After a two-year stint at Peterborough, Dibble joined Ronnie Moore's coaching staff at Rotherham United. In October 2016, Dibble was appointed joint caretaker manager at Rotherham. On 12 January 2017, he left Rotherham United and joined Cardiff City as goalkeeping coach. Dibble left Cardiff in May 2022.

Dibble was appointed Accrington Stanley goalkeeper coach in August 2022.

== Personal life ==
Dibble is the father of professional footballer Christian Dibble, also a goalkeeper who played for Wrexham.

== Honours ==
Luton Town

- Football League Cup: 1987–88

Rangers

- Scottish Premier Division: 1996–97

Wrexham

- FAW Premier Cup: 2002–03, 2003–04

Individual

- Football League Cup final Man of the Match: 1988
