= FA Youth Cup Finals of the 1980s =

List of English football matches

FA Youth Cup Finals from 1980 to 1989.

== 1988–89: Watford vs Manchester City (0–1 and 2–0 aet, 2–1 Aggregate) ==
Note: Flags indicate national team as defined under FIFA eligibility rules; some limited exceptions apply. Players may hold more than one non-FIFA nationality.

Watford
No.	Pos.	Nation	Player
1	GK	ENG	David James
2	DF	ENG	Paul Towler
3	DF	ENG	Jason Drysdale
4	MF	ENG	Jonathan Price
5	DF	ENG	Jason Soloman
6	DF	ENG	Barry Ashby
7	DF	ENG	David Evans
8	FW	ENG	Andrew Gunn
9	FW	ENG	Warren Bennett
10	MF	ENG	Dominic Naylor
11	MF	ENG	Jim Meara
Sub	DF	ENG	Adrian Fuller
Sub	MF	ENG	Rod Thomas

Manchester City
No.	Pos.	Nation	Player
1	GK	WAL	Martyn Margetson
2	DF	NIR	Neil Lennon
3	DF	ENG	John Willis
4	DF	WAL	Mark Peters
5	DF	NIR	Gerry Taggart
6	MF	ENG	Mike Quigley
7	MF	ENG	Ian Thompstone
8	FW	ENG	Ashley Ward
9	FW	ENG	Jason Hasford
10	MF	NIR	Michael Hughes
11	MF	ENG	Michael Wallace
Sub	FW	ENG	Mike Sheron
Sub	MF	ENG	Colin Small

== 1987–88: Arsenal vs Doncaster Rovers (5–0 and 1–1, 6–1 Aggregate) ==
Note: Flags indicate national team as defined under FIFA eligibility rules; some limited exceptions apply. Players may hold more than one non-FIFA nationality.

Arsenal
No.	Pos.	Nation	Player
1	GK	ENG	Alan Miller
2	DF	ENG	Lee Francis
3	DF	SCO	Jim Carstairs
4	MF	ENG	David Hillier (Captain)
5	DF	ENG	Al Hannigan
6	DF	NIR	Steve Morrow
7	MF	ENG	Neil Heaney
8	FW	ENG	Francis Cagigao
9	FW	ENG	Kevin Campbell
10	DF	ENG	Steve Ball
11	MF	ENG	Gary McKeown
Sub	MF	ENG	Ray Lee
Sub	DF	IRL	Pat Scully

Doncaster Rovers
No.	Pos.	Nation	Player
1	GK	ENG	Lee Lamont
2	DF	ENG	Mark Hall
3	DF	ENG	Rufus Brevett
4	DF	ENG	Steve Raffell
5	DF	ENG	Paul Raven
6	MF	ENG	David Snowball
7	MF	ENG	Andy Peckett
8	MF	ENG	Mark Rankine
9	FW	ENG	Neil Morris
10	FW	ENG	Andrew Winship
11	MF	ENG	Steven Gaughan
Sub	MF	ENG	Lee Slingsby
Sub	FW	SCO	Robbie Stewart

== 1986–87: Coventry City vs Charlton Athletic (1–1 and 1–0 aet, 2–1 Aggregate) ==
First leg

Score: Charlton 1–1 Coventry
Date: 28 April 1987
Venue: The Valley
Coventry scorer: Craig Middleton attendance=833

Second leg

Score: Coventry 1–0 Charlton (aet)
Date: 13 May 1987
Venue: Highfield Road
Coventry scorer: Steve Livingstone attendance=12,142 Note: Flags indicate national team as defined under FIFA eligibility rules; some limited exceptions apply. Players may hold more than one non-FIFA nationality.

Coventry City
No.	Pos.	Nation	Player
1	GK	ENG	Paul Bastock
2	DF	ENG	Lee Middleton
3	DF	ENG	Anthony Smith
4	DF	ENG	Tony Dobson
5	DF	ENG	John Gowens (Captain)
6	MF	ENG	Michael Cook
7	MF	ENG	Robert Smith
8	MF	ENG	Howard Clark
9	FW	ENG	Steve Livingstone
10	MF	ENG	Paul Shepstone
11	MF	ENG	Gary Marshall
Sub	DF	ENG	Paul Jones
Sub	MF	ENG	Craig Middleton
Manager		ENG	Mick Coop

Charlton Athletic
No.	Pos.	Nation	Player
1	GK	ENG	Nathan Amato
2	DF	ENG	Paul Bacon
3	DF	ENG	Scott Minto
4	DF	ENG	Darren Pitcher
5	DF	ENG	Geoff Thomas
6	MF	ENG	Peter Evans
7	MF	ENG	Paul Murray
8	MF	ENG	Michael Bennett
9	FW	ENG	Carl Leaburn
10	FW	TRI	Ronnie Mauge
11	MF	ENG	Steve Thurlow
Sub	FW	ENG	Gordon Watson
Sub	MF	ENG	Mark Tivey

== 1985–86: Manchester City vs Manchester United (1–1 and 2–0, 3–1 Aggregate) ==
First leg

Old Trafford, 24 April 1986
Manchester United - Manchester City 1–1 (0–0)
1-0 49 min. Aidan Murphy
1-1 82 min. Paul Lake (pen.)
Attendance: 7.602

Note: Flags indicate national team as defined under FIFA eligibility rules; some limited exceptions apply. Players may hold more than one non-FIFA nationality.

Manchester United
No.	Pos.	Nation	Player
1	GK	ENG	Gary Walsh
2	DF	ENG	Tony Gill
3	DF	ENG	Lee Martin
4	DF	ENG	Ian Scott
5	DF	ENG	Steve Gardner (Captain)
6	DF	ENG	Jon Bottomley
7	MF	ENG	Aidan Murphy (red card) 69'
8	MF	NIR	Mark Todd
9	FW	ENG	Dennis Cronin
10	FW	ENG	David Wilson (substituted off)
11	MF	ENG	Paul Harvey
Sub	FW	ENG	Tony Hopley (substituted on)
Manager		ENG	Eric Harrison

Manchester City
No.	Pos.	Nation	Player
1	GK	ENG	Steve Crompton
2	DF	ENG	Steve Mills
3	DF	ENG	Andy Hinchcliffe
4	DF	ENG	Ian Brightwell
5	DF	ENG	Steve Redmond (Captain)
6	MF	ENG	Andy Thackeray (red card) 69'
7	MF	ENG	David White
8	FW	ENG	Paul Moulden
9	MF	ENG	Paul Lake
10	MF	ENG	Ian Scott
11	FW	SCO	David Boyd
Sub	DF	ENG	Steve Macauley (not used)
Manager		ENG	Tony Book

Second leg

Maine Road, 29 April 1986
Manchester City - Manchester United 2–0 (1–0)
1-0 02 min. David Boyd
2-0 86 min. Paul Moulden
Attendance: 18.158

Note: Flags indicate national team as defined under FIFA eligibility rules; some limited exceptions apply. Players may hold more than one non-FIFA nationality.

Manchester City
No.	Pos.	Nation	Player
1	GK	ENG	Steve Crompton
2	DF	ENG	Steve Mills
3	DF	ENG	Andy Hinchcliffe
4	DF	ENG	Ian Brightwell
5	DF	ENG	Steve Redmond (Captain)
6	MF	ENG	Andy Thackeray
7	MF	ENG	David White
8	FW	ENG	Paul Moulden
9	MF	ENG	Paul Lake
10	MF	ENG	Ian Scott
11	FW	SCO	David Boyd
Sub	DF	ENG	John Bookbinder (not used)
Manager		ENG	Tony Book

Manchester United
No.	Pos.	Nation	Player
1	GK	ENG	Gary Walsh
2	DF	ENG	Tony Gill
3	DF	ENG	Lee Martin
4	DF	ENG	Ian Scott
5	DF	ENG	Steve Gardner (Captain)
6	DF	ENG	Paul Harvey
7	MF	ENG	Aidan Murphy
8	MF	NIR	Mark Todd
9	FW	ENG	Dennis Cronin
10	FW	ENG	Jon Bottomley (substituted off)
11	MF	ENG	Karl Goddard
Sub	FW	ENG	Tony Hopley (substituted on)
Manager		ENG	Eric Harrison

== 1984–85: Newcastle United vs Watford (0–0 and 4–1, 4–1 Aggregate) ==
Newcastle won the cup with a 4-1 second leg victory over Watford after the first leg ended in a goalless draw. Midfielder Paul Gascoigne scored a spectacular goal from 30 yards for the winners. Within five years, Gascoigne was a world class player for Tottenham Hotspur and England, having been transferred from Newcastle in 1988 for £2million. Newcastle's assistant manager Maurice Setters said "You'll have to wait a thousand years to see that again" in reference to Gascoigne's goal in this game.

Note: Flags indicate national team as defined under FIFA eligibility rules; some limited exceptions apply. Players may hold more than one non-FIFA nationality.

Newcastle United
No.	Pos.	Nation	Player
—	GK	IRL	Gary Kelly
—	DF	ENG	Ian McKenzie
—	DF	ENG	Tony Nesbit
—	DF	ENG	Kevin Scott
—	DF	ENG	Jeff Wrightson
—	MF	ENG	Brian Tinnion
—	MF	ENG	Paul Gascoigne
—	MF	ENG	Ian Bogie
—	MF	ENG	Paul Stephenson
—	FW	ENG	Joe Allon
—	FW	ENG	Stephen Forster

Watford
No.	Pos.	Nation	Player

== 1983–84: Everton vs Stoke City (2–2 and 2–0, 4–2 Aggregate) ==
First leg

Goodison Park, 26 April 1984
Everton - Stoke City 2–2
Everton: Wakenshaw, Rimmer
Stoke: Howells, Sutton
Attendance: 9,317 Note: Flags indicate national team as defined under FIFA eligibility rules; some limited exceptions apply. Players may hold more than one non-FIFA nationality.

Everton
No.	Pos.	Nation	Player
1	GK	ENG	Stephen Hall
2	DF	ENG	Darren Oldroyd
3	DF	ENG	Darren Hughes
4	DF	ENG	Ian Macowat
5	DF	ENG	Ian Marshall
6	MF	ENG	John Hood
7	MF	ENG	Michael Fielding
8	MF	ENG	Derek Walsh
9	FW	ENG	Rob Wakenshaw
10	FW	ENG	Neill Rimmer
11	FW	ENG	David O'Brien
12	Sub	ENG	Paul McKenzie

Stoke City
No.	Pos.	Nation	Player
1	GK	ENG	Richard Dawson
2	DF	ENG	Terry Williams
3	DF	ENG	Chris Hemming
4	DF	EIR	Aaron Callaghan
5	DF	ENG	Neil Howells
6	MF	ENG	Steve Parkin
7	MF	ENG	Graham Shaw
8	MF	EIR	Kenny O'Neill
9	FW	ENG	Jon Chapman
10	FW	ENG	Dave Sutton
11	FW	ENG	Roger Johns
Sub	FW	ENG	Neil Mountford

Second leg

Victoria Ground, 8 May 1984
Stoke City - Everton 0–2
Everton: Hughes, Wakenshaw
Attendance:13,895

Note: Flags indicate national team as defined under FIFA eligibility rules; some limited exceptions apply. Players may hold more than one non-FIFA nationality.

Stoke City
No.	Pos.	Nation	Player
1	GK	ENG	Richard Dawson
2	DF	ENG	Terry Williams
3	DF	ENG	Chris Hemming
4	DF	IRL	Aaron Callaghan
5	DF	ENG	Neil Howells
6	MF	ENG	Steve Parkin
7	MF	ENG	Graham Shaw
8	MF	EIR	Kenny O'Neill
9	FW	ENG	Jon Chapman
10	FW	ENG	Dave Sutton
11	FW	ENG	Roger Johns
Sub	FW	ENG	Neil Mountford

Everton
No.	Pos.	Nation	Player
1	GK	ENG	Stephen Hall
2	DF	ENG	Darren Oldroyd
3	DF	ENG	Darren Hughes
4	DF	ENG	Ian Macowat
5	DF	ENG	Ian Marshall
6	MF	ENG	John Hood
7	MF	ENG	Michael Fielding
8	MF	ENG	Derek Walsh
9	FW	ENG	Rob Wakenshaw
10	FW	ENG	Neill Rimmer
11	FW	ENG	David O'Brien
12	Sub	ENG	Paul McKenzie

== 1982–83: Norwich City vs Everton (3–2 and 3–3 aet, 6–5 Aggregate) ==
Note: Flags indicate national team as defined under FIFA eligibility rules; some limited exceptions apply. Players may hold more than one non-FIFA nationality.

Norwich City
No.	Pos.	Nation	Player
1	GK	ENG	Andy Pearce
2	DF	ENG	Daryl Godbold
3	DF	ENG	Tony Spearing
4	DF	ENG	Mark Crowe
5	DF	SCO	Brendan McIntyre
6	MF	WAL	Jeremy Goss
7	MF	ENG	Louie Donowa
8	FW	ENG	Jon Rigby
9	FW	ENG	Paul Clayton
10	MF	ENG	Mark Metcalf
11	MF	ENG	Neil Riley
Sub	MF	SCO	Austin O'Connor

Everton
No.	Pos.	Nation	Player
1	GK	WAL	Ken Hughes
2	DF	ENG	Steve Jones
3	DF	ENG	Darren Hughes
4	DF	ENG	Steve Bateman
5	DF	ENG	Ian Marshall
6	MF	ENG	Ian Bishop
7	MF	ENG	Jimmy Coyle
8	FW	ENG	Ian Macowat
9	MF	ENG	Mark Farrington
10	MF	ENG	Stuart Rimmer
11	FW	ENG	Robbie Wakenshaw
Sub	MF	ENG	John Hood
Sub	MF	ENG	John Morrissey
Sub	DF	ENG	Steve Ashcroft

== 1981–82: Watford vs Manchester United (3–2 and 4–4 aet, 7–6 Aggregate) ==
First leg

Old Trafford, 26 April 1982
Manchester United - Watford 2–3 (1–1)
0-1 34 min. Neil Williams
1-1 44 min. Mark Dempsey
1-2 58 min. Jimmy Gilligan
1-3 77 min. Worrall Sterling
2-3 86 min. Clayton Blackmore
Attendance: 7.280

Note: Flags indicate national team as defined under FIFA eligibility rules; some limited exceptions apply. Players may hold more than one non-FIFA nationality.

Manchester United
No.	Pos.	Nation	Player
1	GK	NIR	Phil Hughes
2	DF	ENG	Andy Hill
3	DF	NIR	Ken Scott
4	DF	SCO	Graeme Hogg (Captain)
5	DF	ENG	Billy Garton
6	MF	WAL	Clayton Blackmore
7	MF	ENG	Lawrence Pearson (substituted off)
8	MF	ENG	Mark Dempsey
9	FW	NIR	Norman Whiteside
10	FW	WAL	Mark Hughes
11	MF	SCO	Peter Docherty
Sub	FW	ENG	Nicky Wood (substituted on)
Manager		ENG	Eric Harrison

Watford
No.	Pos.	Nation	Player
1	GK	ENG	Michael Potts
2	DF	ENG	Nigel Gibbs
3	DF	ENG	Neil Price
4	MF	ENG	Neil Williams
5	DF	ENG	Colin Hull (Captain)
6	DF	ENG	Paul Franklin
7	MF	ENG	Worrell Sterling
8	FW	ENG	Ian Richardson
9	FW	ENG	Jimmy Gilligan
10	MF	ENG	Francis Cassidy
11	MF	ENG	David Johnson
Sub	MF	ENG	Gary Porter (not used)
Manager		WAL	Tom Walley

Second leg

Vicarage Road, 6 May 1982
Watford - Manchester United 4–4 aet 2–3 (2–1)
1-0 10 min. Billy Garton (own goal)
1-1 30 min. Mark Hughes
2-1 35 min. David Johnson
2-2 48 min. Mark Dempsey
2-3 77 min. Mark Hughes
3-3 92 min. Andy Hill (own goal)
3-4 100 min. Norman Whiteside
4-4 103 min. Jimmy Gilligan
Attendance: 8.160

Note: Flags indicate national team as defined under FIFA eligibility rules; some limited exceptions apply. Players may hold more than one non-FIFA nationality.

Watford
No.	Pos.	Nation	Player
1	GK	ENG	Michael Potts
2	DF	ENG	Nigel Gibbs
3	DF	ENG	Neil Price
4	MF	ENG	Neil Williams
5	DF	ENG	Colin Hull (Captain)
6	DF	ENG	Paul Franklin
7	MF	ENG	Worrell Sterling
8	FW	ENG	Ian Richardson
9	FW	ENG	Jimmy Gilligan
10	MF	ENG	Francis Cassidy
11	MF	ENG	David Johnson
Sub	MF	ENG	Gary Porter (not used)
Manager		WAL	Tom Walley

Manchester United
No.	Pos.	Nation	Player
1	GK	NIR	Phil Hughes
2	DF	ENG	Andy Hill
3	DF	NIR	Ken Scott
4	DF	SCO	Graeme Hogg (Captain)
5	DF	ENG	Billy Garton
6	MF	IRL	Sean Williams (substituted off)
7	MF	WAL	Clayton Blackmore
8	MF	ENG	Mark Dempsey
9	FW	NIR	Norman Whiteside
10	FW	WAL	Mark Hughes
11	MF	SCO	Peter Docherty
Sub	FW	ENG	Nicky Wood (substituted on)
Manager		ENG	Eric Harrison

== 1980–81: West Ham United vs Tottenham Hotspur (2–0 and 0–1, 2–1 Aggregate) ==
Note: Flags indicate national team as defined under FIFA eligibility rules; some limited exceptions apply. Players may hold more than one non-FIFA nationality.

West Ham United
No.	Pos.	Nation	Player
1	GK	ENG	John Vaughan
2	DF	ENG	Adrian Keith
3	MF	ENG	Everald La Ronde (Captain)
4	MF	ENG	Wayne Reader
5	DF	ENG	Chris Ampofo
6	DF	ENG	Keith McPherson
7	MF	ENG	Bobby Barnes
8	MF	ENG	Paul Allen
9	MF	ENG	Steve Milton
10	FW	ENG	Glenn Burvill
11	FW	ENG	Mark Schiavi
Sub	MF	ENG	Alan Dickens

Tottenham Hotspur
No.	Pos.	Nation	Player
1	GK	ENG	Tony Parks
2	DF	ENG	Allan Cockram (first leg Mark Entwistle)
3	DF	ENG	Pat Corbett
4	DF	ENG	Simon Webster
5	DF	ENG	Kenny Dixon
6	MF	ENG	John Cooper
7	MF	ENG	Steve Cox
8	MF	ENG	Ian Crook
9	FW	ENG	Terry Gibson
10	FW	ENG	Jimmy Bolton (substituted off)
11	MF	WAL	Mark Bowen
Sub	MF	ENG	Paul Wilkins (substituted on) (first leg unused)

== 1979–80: Aston Villa vs Manchester City (3–1 and 0–1, 3–2 Aggregate) ==
Note: Flags indicate national team as defined under FIFA eligibility rules; some limited exceptions apply. Players may hold more than one non-FIFA nationality.

Aston Villa
No.	Pos.	Nation	Player
1	GK	ENG	Mark Kendall
2	DF	JAM	Noel Blake
3	DF	ENG	Duncan Heath
4	DF	ENG	Mark Jones
5	DF	ENG	David Mail
6	DF	ENG	Andy Taylor
7	MF	ENG	Paul Birch
8	MF	ENG	Robert Hopkins
9	MF	ENG	Mark Hutchinson
10	MF	ENG	Ray Walker
11	MF	ENG	Mark Walters
—	FW	ENG	Trevor Ames
—	FW	WAL	Tony Rees

Manchester City
No.	Pos.	Nation	Player
1	GK	ENG	Alex Williams
2	DF	ENG	Andy May
3	DF	ENG	Dick Cunningham
4	DF	ENG	Gary Bennett
5	DF	ENG	Tommy Caton
6	MF	ENG	Ross McGinn
7	MF	ENG	Keith Parkinson
8	MF	ENG	Steve MacKenzie
9	MF	WAL	Gary Bees
10	FW	ENG	Steve Kinsey
11	FW	ENG	Clive Wilson
