= 1987–88 Manchester City F.C. season =

English football club season

Manchester City
1987–88 season
- Chairman: Peter Swales
- Manager: Mel Machin
- Second Division: 9th
- FA Cup: Sixth round
- League Cup: Fifth round
- Full Members' Cup: Second round
- Top goalscorer: League: All: Paul Stewart (27)
- Highest home attendance: 44,047 vs Liverpool; 13 March 1988
- Average home league attendance: 19,471 (highest in league, 11th highest in England)
Home colours

The 1987–88 season was Manchester City's first season in the Football League Second Division, the second division of English football.

== League ==
=== Final league table ===
Pos	Team	Pld	W	D	L	GF	GA	GD	Pts
7	Leeds United	44	19	12	13	61	51	+10	69
8	Ipswich Town	44	19	9	16	61	52	+9	66
9	Manchester City	44	19	8	17	80	60	+20	65
10	Oldham Athletic	44	18	11	15	72	64	+8	65
11	Stoke City	44	17	11	16	50	57	−7	62

Rules for classification: 1) Points; 2) Goal difference; 3) Goals scored

=== Results summary ===
Overall								Home						Away					
Pld	W	D	L	GF	GA	GD	Pts	W	D	L	GF	GA	GD	W	D	L	GF	GA	GD
44	19	8	17	80	60	+20	65	11	4	7	50	28	+22	8	4	10	30	32	−2

=== Match reports ===
15 August 1987	Manchester City	2–1	Plymouth	Manchester
				Stadium: Maine Road

22 August 1987	Oldham Athletic	1–1	Manchester City	Boundary Park

31 August 1987	Aston Villa	1–1	Manchester City	Villa Park

5 September 1987	Manchester City	1–2	Blackburn Rovers	Maine Road

12 September 1987	Shrewsbury Town	0–0	Manchester City	Gay Meadow

16 September 1987	Manchester City	4–0	Millwall	Maine Road

19 September 1987	Manchester City	3–0	Stoke City	Maine Road

26 September 1987	Leeds United	2–0	Manchester City	Elland Road

29 September 1987	Hull City	3–1	Manchester City	Boothferry Park

3 October 1987	Manchester City	4–2	Leicester City	Maine Road

10 October 1987	Manchester City	2–3	Sheffield United	Maine Road

17 October 1987	Ipswich Town	3–0	Manchester City	Portman Road

21 October 1987	Bradford City	2–4	Manchester City	Valley Parade

24 October 1987	Manchester City	1–1	Barnsley	Maine Road

31 October 1987	Swindon Town	3–4	Manchester City	County Ground

4 November 1987	Manchester City	1–1	Middlesbrough	Maine Road

7 November 1987	Manchester City	10–1	Huddersfield Town	Maine Road

14 November 1987	Reading	0–2	Manchester City	Elm Park

21 November 1987	Manchester City	3–0	Birmingham City	Maine Road

28 November 1987	West Bromwich Albion	1–1	Manchester City	The Hawthorns

1 December 1987	Bournemouth	0–2	Manchester City	Dean Court

5 December 1987	Manchester City	1–3	Crystal Palace	Maine Road

12 December 1987	Millwall	0–1	Manchester City	The Den

19 December 1987	Manchester City	1–2	Oldham Athletic	Maine Road

26 December 1987	Manchester City	1–2	Leeds	Maine Road

28 December 1987	Stoke City	1–3	Manchester City	Victoria Ground

2 January 1988	Manchester City	1–3	Shrewsbury Town	Maine Road

16 January 1988	Plymouth	3–2	Manchester City	Home Park

23 January 1988	Manchester City	0–2	Aston Villa	Maine Road

6 February 1988	Blackburn	2–1	Manchester City	Ewood Park

13 February 1988	Manchester City	2–0	Bournemouth	Maine Road

27 February 1988	Leicester City	1–0	Manchester City	Filbert Street

2 March 1988	Manchester City	2–0	Hull City	Maine Road

5 March 1988	Manchester City	2–0	Ipswich	Maine Road

8 March 1988	Sheffield United	1–2	Manchester City	Bramall Lane

19 March 1988	Manchester City	1–1	Swindon Town	Maine Road

26 March 1988	Barnsley	3–1	Manchester City	Oakwell

2 April 1988	Huddersfield Town	1–0	Manchester City	Leeds Road

4 April 1988	Manchester City	2–0	Reading	Maine Road

9 April 1988	Middlesbrough	2–1	Manchester City	Ayresome Park

23 April 1988	Manchester City	2–2	Bradford City	Maine Road

30 April 1988	Birmingham City	0–3	Manchester City	St Andrew's

2 May 1988	Manchester City	4–2	West Bromwich Albion	Maine Road

7 May 1988	Crystal Palace	2–0	Manchester City	Selhurst Park

== FA Cup ==
=== Match reports ===
08-01-1988 Third Round	Huddersfield Town	2–2	Manchester City	Leeds Road
	Shearer (2)			Attendance: 18,102

11-01-1988 Third Round	Manchester City	0–0	Huddersfield Town	Maine Road
				Attendance: 24,565

24-01-1988 Third Round	Huddersfield Town	0–3	Manchester City	Leeds Road
				Attendance: 21,510

29-01-1988 Fourth Round	Blackpool	1–1	Manchester City	Bloomfield Road

02-02-1988 Fourth Round	Manchester City	2–1	Blackpool	Maine Road

19-02-1988 Round of 16	Manchester City	3–1	Plymouth Argyle	Maine Road

12-03-1988 Quarter-finals	Manchester City	0–4	Liverpool	Maine Road

== League Cup ==
=== Match reports ===
22 September 1987 Second Round	Manchester City	1–2	Wolverhampton Wanderers	Maine Road

6 October 1987 Second Round	Wolverhampton Wanderers	0–2	Manchester City	Molineux Stadium

27 October 1987 Third Round	Manchester City	3–0	Nottingham Forest	Maine Road

17 November 1987 Fourth Round	Manchester City	3–1	Watford	Maine Road

20 January 1988 Fifth Round	Everton	2–0	Manchester City	Goodison Park

== Full Members' Cup ==
=== Match reports ===
10 November 1987 First Round	Manchester City	6–2	Plymouth Argyle	Maine Road

16 December 1987 Second Round	Manchester City	0–2	Chelsea	Maine Road

== Squad ==
Note: Flags indicate national team as defined under FIFA eligibility rules; some limited exceptions apply. Players may hold more than one non-FIFA nationality.

Pos.	Nation	Player
GK	ENG	Eric Nixon
GK	ENG	Perry Suckling
DF	ENG	David Brightwell
DF	ENG	Ian Brightwell
DF	ENG	John Gidman
DF	ENG	Andy Hinchcliffe
DF	ENG	Steve Redmond
DF	ENG	Mark Seagraves
MF	ENG	Paul Lake

Pos.	Nation	Player
MF	ENG	Kevin Langley
MF	NIR	Neil Lennon
MF	SCO	Neil McNab
MF	ENG	Paul Simpson
MF	ENG	Paul Warhurst
MF	ENG	David White
FW	ENG	Jason Beckford
FW	ENG	Paul Moulden
FW	ENG	Imre Váradi

== Transfers ==
=== In ===
Date	Pos.	Name	From	Fee
07/87	DF	(England) Mark Seagraves	(England) Liverpool	

=== Out ===
Date	Pos.	Name	To	Fee
03/88	DF	(England) Kenny Clements	(England) Bury	
06/87	MF	(England) Graham Baker	(England) Southampton	
06/87	DF	(England) Earl Barrett	(England) Oldham Athletic	
06/87	FW	(England) Darren Beckford	(England) Port Vale	
06/87	MF	(Republic of Ireland) Tony Grealish	(England) Rotherham United	
06/87	FW	(England) Robert Hopkins	(England) West Bromwich Albion	
06/87	MF	(England) Andy May	(England) Huddersfield Town	
06/87	DF	(Republic of Ireland) Mick McCarthy	(Scotland) Celtic	
06/87	DF	(England) Nicky Reid	(England) Blackburn Rovers	
06/87	DF	(England) Clive Wilson	(England) Chelsea	
