= 1991–92 Birmingham City F.C. season =

Birmingham City F.C.
1991–92 season
- Chairman: Samesh Kumar
- Manager: Bill Coldwell (caretaker); Terry Cooper; (from August 1991)
- Ground: St Andrew's
- Football League Third Division: 2nd (promoted)
- FA Cup: First round (eliminated by Torquay United)
- League Cup: Third round (eliminated by Crystal Palace)
- Associate Members' Cup: Group stage
- Top goalscorer: League: Nigel Gleghorn (17); All: Nigel Gleghorn (22)
- Highest home attendance: 27,608 vs West Bromwich Albion, 8 February 1992
- Lowest home attendance: 5,239 vs Walsall, Associate Members' Cup, 7 January 1992
- Average home league attendance: 12,399
Home colours

The 1991–92 Football League season was Birmingham City Football Club's 89th season in the Football League and 3rd in the Third Division. They finished in second place in the 24-team division, so were promoted back to the second tier for the 1992–93 season. They entered the 1991–92 FA Cup in the first round proper and lost in that round to Torquay United, eliminated Exeter City and Luton Town from the League Cup before losing to Crystal Palace after two replays, and failed to progress past the preliminary round of the Associate Members' Cup.

Nigel Gleghorn was the club's top goalscorer, with 17 goals in the league, and 22 in all competitions.

After Lou Macari had quit as manager at the end of the 1990–91 season, and caretaker Bill Coldwell had persuaded all the out-of-contract players apart from Vince Overson to renew, Terry Cooper was appointed manager in August, only a week before the playing season started.

== Football League Third Division ==
| Date | League position | Opponents | Venue | Result | Score F–A | Scorers | Attendance |
|---|---|---|---|---|---|---|---|
| 17 August 1991 | 6th | Bury | H | W | 3–2 | Gleghorn, Gayle, Okenla | 9,033 |
| 24 August 1991 | 3rd | Fulham | A | W | 1–0 | Rodgerson | 4,762 |
| 31 August 1991 | 1st | Darlington | H | W | 1–0 | Sturridge | 8,768 |
| 3 September 1991 | 1st | Hull City | A | W | 2–1 | Sturridge, Rodgerson | 4,801 |
| 7 September 1991 | 2nd | Reading | A | D | 1–1 | Sturridge | 6,649 |
| 14 September 1991 | 1st | Peterborough United | H | D | 1–1 | Cooper | 9,408 |
| 17 September 1991 | 1st | Chester City | H | W | 3–2 | Sturridge, Frain (pen.), Gleghorn | 8,154 |
| 21 September 1991 | 2nd | Hartlepool United | A | L | 0–1 | | 4,643 |
| 28 September 1991 | 2nd | Preston North End | H | W | 3–1 | Matthewson, Gleghorn, Rodgerson | 8,260 |
| 5 October 1991 | 2nd | Shrewsbury Town | A | D | 1–1 | Gleghorn | 7,035 |
| 12 October 1991 | 1st | Stockport County | H | W | 3–0 | Cooper, Drinkell, Donowa | 12,364 |
| 19 October 1991 | 2nd | Wigan Athletic | H | D | 3–3 | Sturridge, Gleghorn, Rodgerson | 9,662 |
| 26 October 1991 | 1st | West Bromwich Albion | A | W | 1–0 | Drinkell | 26,168 |
| 2 November 1991 | 1st | Torquay United | H | W | 3–0 | Gleghorn (pen.), Sturridge, Donowa | 9,408 |
| 6 November 1991 | 1st | Brentford | A | D | 2–2 | Sturridge, Cooper | 8,798 |
| 9 November 1991 | 2nd | Huddersfield Town | A | L | 2–3 | Gleghorn, Matthewson | 11,688 |
| 23 November 1991 | 2nd | Exeter City | H | W | 1–0 | Gleghorn | 11,319 |
| 30 November 1991 | 2nd | Bradford City | H | W | 2–0 | Peer, Gleghorn | 10,468 |
| 14 December 1991 | 2nd | Bournemouth | A | L | 1–2 | Paskin | 6,048 |
| 21 December 1991 | 1st | Fulham | H | W | 3–1 | Gleghorn, Rodgerson 2 | 8,877 |
| 26 December 1991 | 2nd | Darlington | A | D | 1–1 | Rodgerson | 4,422 |
| 28 December 1991 | 3rd | Bury | A | L | 0–1 | | 4,253 |
| 1 January 1992 | 2nd | Hull City | H | D | 2–2 | Paskin, Gleghorn | 12,983 |
| 4 January 1992 | 2nd | Stoke City | A | L | 1–2 | Beckford | 19,096 |
| 11 January 1992 | 3rd | Leyton Orient | H | D | 2–2 | Cooper, Paskin | 10,445 |
| 18 January 1992 | 2nd | Swansea City | A | W | 2–0 | Rodgerson, Rowbotham | 4,147 |
| 8 February 1992 | 4th | West Bromwich Albion | H | L | 0–3 | | 27,508 |
| 11 February 1992 | 4th | Bradford City | A | W | 2–1 | Gleghorn, Sturridge | 7,008 |
| 15 February 1992 | 5th | A.F.C. Bournemouth | H | L | 0–1 | | 10,898 |
| 22 February 1992 | 6th | Leyton Orient | A | D | 0–0 | | 6,025 |
| 29 February 1992 | 5th | Stoke City | H | D | 1–1 | Frain (pen.) | 22,162 |
| 3 March 1992 | 5th | Swansea City | H | D | 1–1 | Rowbotham | 9,475 |
| 10 March 1992 | 5th | Brentford | H | W | 1–0 | Matthewson | 13,290 |
| 17 March 1992 | 6th | Bolton Wanderers | A | D | 1–1 | Rodgerson | 7,329 |
| 21 March 1992 | 6th | Huddersfield Town | H | W | 2–0 | Sturridge, Gleghorn | 12,482 |
| 24 March 1992 | 2nd | Torquay United | A | W | 2–1 | Rowbotham, Matthewson | 2,446 |
| 28 March 1992 | 3rd | Exeter City | A | L | 1–2 | Hicks | 5,210 |
| 31 March 1992 | 3rd | Peterborough United | A | W | 3–2 | Frain (pen.), Sturridge, Matthewson | 12,085 |
| 4 April 1992 | 2nd | Reading | H | W | 2–0 | Rowbotham, Frain (pen.) | 12,229 |
| 11 April 1992 | 2nd | Chester City | A | W | 1–0 | Gleghorn | 4,895 |
| 14 April 1992 | 1st | Bolton Wanderers | H | W | 2–1 | Frain (pen.), Rennie | 14,440 |
| 18 April 1992 | 1st | Hartlepool United | H | W | 2–1 | Matthewson, Gleghorn | 13,698 |
| 21 April 1992 | 1st | Preston North End | A | L | 2–3 | Gleghorn, Rennie | 7,740 |
| 25 April 1992 | 1st | Shrewsbury Town | H | W | 1–0 | Gleghorn | 19,868 |
| 28 April 1992 | 1st | Wigan Athletic | A | L | 0–3 | | 5,950 |
| 2 May 1992 | 2nd | Stockport County | A | L | 0–2 | | 7,840 |

=== League table (part) ===
Final Third Division table (part)
| Pos | Team | Pld | W | D | L | GF | GA | GD | Pts |
|---|---|---|---|---|---|---|---|---|---|
| 1st | Brentford | 46 | 25 | 7 | 14 | 81 | 55 | +26 | 82 |
| 2nd | Birmingham City | 46 | 23 | 12 | 11 | 69 | 52 | +17 | 81 |
| 3rd | Huddersfield Town | 46 | 22 | 12 | 12 | 59 | 38 | +21 | 78 |
| 4th | Stoke City | 46 | 21 | 14 | 11 | 69 | 49 | +20 | 77 |
| 5th | Stockport County | 46 | 22 | 10 | 14 | 75 | 51 | +24 | 76 |

=== Results summary ===
| Overall | | | | | | | | Home | | | | | | Away | | | | | |
| Pld | W | D | L | GF | GA | GD | Pts | W | D | L | GF | GA | GD | W | D | L | GF | GA | GD |
|---|---|---|---|---|---|---|---|---|---|---|---|---|---|---|---|---|---|---|---|
| 46 | 23 | 12 | 11 | 69 | 52 | +17 | 81 | 15 | 6 | 2 | 42 | 22 | +20 | 8 | 6 | 9 | 27 | 30 | −3 |

== FA Cup ==
| Round | Date | Opponents | Venue | Result | Score F–A | Scorers | Attendance |
|---|---|---|---|---|---|---|---|
| First round | 16 November 1991 | Torquay United | A | L | 0–3 | | 4,123 |

== League Cup ==
| Round | Date | Opponents | Venue | Result | Score F–A | Scorers | Attendance |
|---|---|---|---|---|---|---|---|
| First round 1st leg | 20 August 1991 | Exeter City | A | W | 1–0 | Rodgerson | 4,071 |
| First round 2nd leg | 27 August 1991 | Exeter City | H | W | 4–0 | Hicks, Yates, Peer, Gleghorn | 6,177 |
| Second round 1st leg | 25 September 1991 | Luton Town | A | D | 2–2 | Rodgerson, Gleghorn | 6,315 |
| Second round 2nd leg | 8 October 1991 | Luton Town | H | W | 3–2 | Peer, Gleghorn 2 | 13,252 |
| Third round | 29 October 1991 | Crystal Palace | H | D | 1–1 | Sturridge | 17,270 |
| Third round replay | 19 November 1991 | Crystal Palace | A | D | 1–1 (aet) | Gleghorn | 10,698 |
| Third round 2nd replay | 3 December 1991 | Crystal Palace | A | L | 1–2 | Peer | 11,384 |

== Associate Members' Cup ==
| Round | Date | Opponents | Venue | Result | Score F–A | Scorers | Attendance |
|---|---|---|---|---|---|---|---|
| Preliminary round | 18 December 1991 | Stoke City | A | L | 1–3 | Tait | 5,932 |
| Preliminary round | 7 January 1992 | Walsall | H | L | 0–1 | | 5,239 |

== Appearances and goals ==
Numbers in parentheses denote appearances made as a substitute.
Players with name in italics and marked * were on loan from another club for the whole of their season with Birmingham.
Players marked † left the club during the playing season.
Key to positions: GK – Goalkeeper; DF – Defender; MF – Midfielder; FW – Forward

Players' appearances and goals by competition
| Pos. | Nat. | Name | League | | FA Cup | | League Cup | | Associate Members' Cup | | Total | |
| Pos. | Nat. | Name | Apps | Goals | Apps | Goals | Apps | Goals | Apps | Goals | Apps | Goals |
|---|---|---|---|---|---|---|---|---|---|---|---|---|
| GK | ENG | Tim Carter * | 2 | 0 | 0 | 0 | 1 | 0 | 0 | 0 | 3 | 0 |
| GK | ENG | John Cheesewright † | 1 | 0 | 0 | 0 | 0 | 0 | 1 | 0 | 2 | 0 |
| GK | ENG | Kevin Dearden * | 12 | 0 | 0 | 0 | 0 | 0 | 0 | 0 | 12 | 0 |
| GK | ENG | Alan Miller * | 15 | 0 | 0 | 0 | 0 | 0 | 1 | 0 | 16 | 0 |
| GK | ENG | Martin Thomas | 16 | 0 | 1 | 0 | 6 | 0 | 0 | 0 | 23 | 0 |
| DF | ENG | Ian Atkins | 5 (3) | 0 | 0 | 0 | 0 | 0 | 1 | 0 | 6 (3) | 0 |
| DF | ENG | Ian Clarkson | 42 | 0 | 1 | 0 | 7 | 0 | 2 | 0 | 52 | 0 |
| DF | ENG | John Frain | 44 | 5 | 1 | 0 | 7 | 0 | 2 | 0 | 54 | 5 |
| DF | ENG | Martin Hicks | 41 (1) | 1 | 1 | 0 | 5 (1) | 1 | 2 | 0 | 49 (2) | 2 |
| DF | WAL | Paul Mardon | 31 (4) | 0 | 1 | 0 | 7 | 0 | 1 | 0 | 40 (4) | 0 |
| DF | ENG | Trevor Matthewson | 35 (1) | 6 | 1 | 0 | 5 | 0 | 1 | 0 | 42 (1) | 6 |
| MF | ENG | Mark Cooper | 27 (6) | 4 | 1 | 0 | 0 | 0 | 2 | 0 | 30 (1) | 4 |
| MF | IRL | Eamonn Dolan † | 1 (1) | 0 | 0 | 0 | 2 | 0 | 0 | 0 | 3 (1) | 0 |
| MF | ENG | Louie Donowa | 20 (6) | 2 | 1 | 0 | 5 | 0 | 0 | 0 | 26 (6) | 2 |
| MF | ENG | David Foy | 0 | 0 | 0 | 0 | 0 (1) | 0 | 0 | 0 | 0 (1) | 0 |
| MF | ENG | Paul Jones | 0 (1) | 0 | 0 | 0 | 0 (1) | 0 | 0 | 0 | 0 (2) | 0 |
| MF | NGR | Foley Okenla | 2 (5) | 1 | 0 | 0 | 1 | 0 | 1 (1) | 0 | 4 (6) | 1 |
| MF | ENG | Dean Peer | 18 (3) | 1 | 0 (1) | 0 | 7 | 3 | 2 | 0 | 27 (4) | 4 |
| MF | SCO | David Rennie | 17 (2) | 0 | 0 | 0 | 0 | 0 | 0 | 0 | 17 (0) | 0 |
| MF | ENG | Ian Rodgerson | 36 (1) | 9 | 1 | 0 | 6 | 2 | 2 | 0 | 45 (1) | 11 |
| MF | ENG | Paul Tait | 10 (2) | 0 | 0 | 0 | 2 | 0 | 1 | 1 | 13 (2) | 1 |
| MF | ENG | Mark Yates † | 1 (1) | 0 | 0 | 0 | 2 | 1 | 0 | 0 | 3 (1) | 1 |
| FW | ENG | Trevor Aylott † | 2 | 0 | 0 | 0 | 0 | 0 | 0 | 0 | 2 | 0 |
| FW | ENG | Jason Beckford | 2 (2) | 1 | 0 | 0 | 0 | 0 | 1 | 0 | 3 (2) | 1 |
| FW | ENG | Kevin Drinkell * | 5 | 2 | 0 | 0 | 0 | 0 | 0 | 0 | 5 | 2 |
| FW | ENG | Sean Francis | 0 (3) | 0 | 0 | 0 | 0 | 0 | 0 | 0 | 0 (3) | 0 |
| FW | ENG | John Gayle | 2 (1) | 1 | 0 | 0 | 0 | 0 | 0 | 0 | 2 (1) | 1 |
| FW | ENG | Nigel Gleghorn | 46 | 17 | 1 | 0 | 7 | 5 | 2 | 0 | 56 | 22 |
| FW | IRL | Eric Hogan | 0 (1) | 0 | 0 | 0 | 0 | 0 | 0 (1) | 0 | 0 (2) | 0 |
| FW | IRL | Alan O'Neill | 2 (2) | 0 | 0 | 0 | 0 | 0 | 0 | 0 | 2 (2) | 0 |
| FW | RSA | John Paskin * | 8 (2) | 3 | 0 | 0 | 0 (1) | 0 | 0 | 0 | 8 (3) | 3 |
| FW | ENG | Darran Rowbotham | 21 (1) | 4 | 0 | 0 | 0 | 0 | 0 | 0 | 21 (1) | 4 |
| FW | ENG | Mark Sale | 2 (4) | 0 | 0 | 0 | 0 | 0 | 0 | 0 | 2 (4) | 0 |
| FW | ENG | Simon Sturridge | 38 (2) | 10 | 1 | 0 | 7 | 1 | 0 | 0 | 46 (2) | 11 |

== See also ==
- Birmingham City F.C. seasons

== Sources ==
- Matthews, Tony (1995). Birmingham City: A Complete Record. Derby: Breedon Books. ISBN 978-1-85983-010-9.
- Matthews, Tony (2010). Birmingham City: The Complete Record. Derby: DB Publishing. ISBN 978-1-85983-853-2.
- For match dates, league positions and results: "Birmingham City 1991–1992: Results". Statto Organisation. Archived from the original on 6 September 2015.
- For lineups, appearances, goalscorers and attendances: Matthews (2010), Complete Record, pp. 418–19, 481.
