= 1988–89 Manchester City F.C. season =

English football club season

Manchester City
1988–89 season
- Chairman: Peter Swales
- Manager: Mel Machin
- Stadium: Maine Road
- Second Division: 2nd (promoted)
- FA Cup: Fourth round
- League Cup: Fourth round
- Full Members' Cup: First round
- Top goalscorer: League: Paul Moulden (13); All: Paul Moulden (17)
- Highest home attendance: 40,070 vs Chelsea; 17 March 1989
- Lowest home attendance: 16,033 vs Brighton & Hove Albion; 17 September 1988
- Average home league attendance: 23,500 (highest in league, 5th highest in England)
Home colours

The 1988–89 season was Manchester City's second consecutive season in the second tier of English football, the Football League Second Division.

== Final league table ==
Pos	Team	Pld	W	D	L	GF	GA	GD	Pts	Qualification or relegation
1	Chelsea (C, P)	46	29	12	5	96	50	+46	99	Promotion to the First Division
2	Manchester City (P)	46	23	13	10	77	53	+24	82	Promotion to the First Division
3	Crystal Palace (O, P)	46	23	12	11	71	49	+22	81	Qualification for the Second Division play-offs
4	Watford	46	22	12	12	74	48	+26	78	Qualification for the Second Division play-offs
5	Blackburn Rovers	46	22	11	13	74	59	+15	77	Qualification for the Second Division play-offs

Source: thestatcat.co.uk
Rules for classification: 1) Points; 2) Goal difference; 3) Goals scored
(C) Champions; (O) Play-off winners; (P) Promoted

=== Results summary ===
Overall								Home						Away					
Pld	W	D	L	GF	GA	GD	Pts	W	D	L	GF	GA	GD	W	D	L	GF	GA	GD
46	23	13	10	77	53	+24	82	12	8	3	48	28	+20	11	5	7	29	25	+4

== Results ==
Manchester City's score comes first

=== Legend ===
Win	Draw	Loss

=== Football League Second Division ===
Date	Opponent	Venue	Result	Attendance	Scorers
27 August 1988	Hull City	A	0–1	11,653	
29 August 1988	Oldham Athletic	H	1–4	22,594	Lake
3 September 1988	Walsall	H	2–2	17,104	McNab, Morley
10 September 1988	Leeds United	A	1–1	23,677	McNab
17 September 1988	Brighton & Hove Albion	H	2–1	16,033	Brightwell, Moulden
20 September 1988	Chelsea	A	3–1	8,071	Brightwell (2), Moulden
24 September 1988	Barnsley	A	2–1	9,300	Morley, White
1 October 1988	Blackburn Rovers	H	1–0	22,111	Biggins
5 October 1988	Portsmouth	H	4–1	17,202	Biggins, Lake, Moulden, White
8 October 1988	Ipswich Town	A	0–1	15,521	
15 October 1988	Plymouth Argyle	A	1–0	10,158	Gayle
22 October 1988	Birmingham City	H	0–0	20,205	
26 October 1988	West Bromwich Albion	A	0–1	14,258	
29 October 1988	Sunderland	H	1–1	22,398	Hinchcliffe
5 November 1988	Leicester City	A	0–0	14,080	
12 November 1988	Watford	H	3–1	21,142	Biggins (2), Moulden
19 November 1988	AFC Bournemouth	A	1–0	9,874	Moulden
26 November 1988	Oxford United	H	2–1	20,145	Morley, Redmond
3 December 1988	Crystal Palace	A	0–0	12,274	
10 December 1988	Bradford City	H	4–0	20,129	Brightwell (2), Moulden (2)
17 December 1988	Shrewsbury Town	H	2–2	19,613	Hinchcliffe (2)
26 December 1988	Stoke City	A	1–3	24,059	Gleghorn
31 December 1988	Swindon Town	A	2–1	10,776	Beckford, Gayle
2 January 1989	Leeds United	H	0–0	33,034	
14 January 1989	Oldham Athletic	A	1–0	19,536	Megson
21 January 1989	Hull City	H	4–1	20,485	Biggins (2), Moulden, White
4 February 1989	Portsmouth	A	1–0	13,187	Gleghorn
11 February 1989	Ipswich Town	H	4–0	22,145	Biggins (2), Gayle, Morley
18 February 1989	Birmingham City	A	2–0	11,707	Gleghorn, McNab
25 February 1989	Plymouth Argyle	H	2–0	22,451	Biggins, McNab
1 March 1989	West Bromwich Albion	H	1–1	25,109	Moulden
4 March 1989	Watford	A	0–1	15,747	
11 March 1989	Leicester City	H	4–2	22,266	Morley (3), Own Goal
14 March 1989	Sunderland	A	4–2	16,167	White (2), Gleghorn, Morley
18 March 1989	Chelsea	H	2–3	40,070	McNab, Taggart
25 March 1989	Walsall	A	3–3	7,562	Moulden (2), Oldfield
27 March 1989	Stoke City	H	2–1	28,303	Hinchcliffe, Oldfield
1 April 1989	Brighton & Hove Albion	A	1–2	12,072	Morley
4 April 1989	Shrewsbury Town	A	1–0	8,271	Morley
8 April 1989	Swindon Town	H	2–1	22,663	Hinchcliffe, Oldfield
15 April 1989	Blackburn Rovers	A	0–4	16,927	
22 April 1989	Barnsley	H	1–2	21,274	Lake
29 April 1989	Oxford United	A	4–2	7,762	Brightwell, Gleghorn, White, Own Goal
1 May 1989	Crystal Palace	H	1–1	33,456	Gleghorn
6 May 1989	AFC Bournemouth	H	3–3	30,564	Moulden (2), Morley
13 May 1989	Bradford City	A	1–1	12,479	Morley

=== Football League Cup ===
Round	Date	Opponent	Venue	Result	Attendance	Scorers
R2 1st Leg	28 September 1988	Plymouth Argyle	H	1–0	9,454	White
R2 2nd Leg	12 October 1988	Plymouth Argyle	A	6–3 (won 7–3 on agg)	8,794	Gleghorn (2), Biggins, Lake, McNab, Moulden
R3	2 November 1988	Sheffield United	H	4–2	16,609	Moulden (3), Morley
R4	29 November 1988	Luton Town	A	1–3	10,178	White

=== FA Cup ===
Round	Date	Opponent	Venue	Result	Attendance	Scorers
R3	7 January 1989	Leicester City	H	1–0	23,838	McNab
R4	28 January 1989	Brentford	A	1–3	12,000	Gleghorn

=== Full Members' Cup ===
Round	Date	Opponent	Venue	Result	Attendance	Goalscorers
R1	13 December 1988	Blackburn Rovers	A	2–3 (aet)	5,763	Gleghorn, Own Goal

== Squad ==
Note: Flags indicate national team as defined under FIFA eligibility rules; some limited exceptions apply. Players may hold more than one non-FIFA nationality.

Pos.	Nation	Player
GK	WAL	Andy Dibble
GK	ENG	Paul Cooper
DF	ENG	Brian Gayle
DF	ENG	Andy Hinchcliffe
DF	ENG	Steve Redmond
DF	ENG	Mark Seagraves
DF	NIR	Gerry Taggart
DF	ENG	Bill Williams
MF	ENG	Paul Lake
MF	SCO	Neil McNab
MF	ENG	Ian Brightwell
MF	ENG	Dean Kilroy

Pos.	Nation	Player
MF	ENG	Carl Bradshaw
MF	ENG	Ian Scott
MF	NIR	Michael Hughes
FW	ENG	David White
FW	ENG	Trevor Morley
FW	ENG	Paul Moulden
FW	ENG	Wayne Biggins
FW	ENG	Nigel Gleghorn
FW	ENG	Jason Beckford
FW	ENG	Imre Varadi
FW	ENG	Paul Simpson
FW	ENG	David Oldfield
