= Raymond Lee =

Raymond Lee may refer to:

- Raymond Lee (director), Hong Kong director and television producer
- Raymond Lee (soccer) (born 1993), American soccer player
- Raymond Lee (actor) (born 1987), American actor
- Raymond Lee (film historian)
- Raymond Harry Shoon Lee, Hong Kong politician, doctor and educator
- Ray Lee, former English footballer who played as a right winger
