= Neil Price =

Neil Price may refer to:

- Neil Price (footballer) (born 1964), English retired footballer
- Neil Price (archaeologist), English archaeologist
