= Shepstone =

Shepstone is a surname. Notable people with the surname include:

- Denis Gem Shepstone (1888–1966), South African politician
- George Shepstone (1876–1940), South African cricketer
- Mike Shepstone (born in 1943), English drummer of The Rokes band
- Paul Shepstone (born in 1970), English professional footballer
- Theophilus Shepstone (1817–1893), British South African statesman

== See also ==
- Port Shepstone, a town in South Africa named after Theopilus Shepstone
