= Mark Metcalf (disambiguation) =

Mark Metcalf may refer to:

- Mark Metcalf (actor) (born 1946), American cast as antagonistic and aggrieved authority figures
- Mark Metcalf (politician) (born 1958), American Republican elected Kentucky State Treasurer in 2023
- Mark Metcalf (footballer) (born 1965), English centre-half for Norwich City F.C.
