= Francis Cagigao =

English footballer and coach

Francis Cagigao Souto
Personal information
- Full name: Francisco Cagigao Souto
- Date of birth: 10 November 1969 (age 56)
- Place of birth: Paddington, London, England
- Position: Midfielder

Youth career
- 1984–1988: Arsenal

Senior career*
Years	Team	Apps	(Gls)
1988–1989	Barcelona B	9	
1989–1991	Racing Santander	2	
1991–1993	Southend United	1	(0)
1993–1994	Racing de Ferrol	27	
1994–1995	Yeclano Deportivo	33	
1995–1999	Club Lemos		
- * Club domestic league appearances and goals

Francisco "Francis" Cagigao Souto (born 10 November 1969) is a London born Spanish football Sporting Director/Head of Recruitmentscout, Coach and former player and currently serves as the Global Director, in charge of recruitment and strategy, of Galatasaray in Turkey. He played for Arsenal, where he won the FA Youth Cup in 1988 under Pat Rice, Barcelona B, Racing de Santander, Southend United, Racing de Ferrol and Yeclano Deportivo in the second tier. A Spanish u19/20 International, his career was cut short at the age of 29 due to injury. He coached Club Lemos to the Segunda División B play-offs in Spain.

== Career ==
The trilingual Cagigao worked under Arsène Wenger for 21 years, followed by Unai Emery and Mikel Arteta. He has close ties with the Spanish FA where he has served as an instructor on the Director of Football course.

He was responsible for direct participation in the signings of players such as Lauren, Cesc Fabregas, Jose Antonio Reyes, Santi Cazorla, Nacho Monreal, Mikel Arteta, Emiliano Martinez, Granit Xhaka, Alexis, Carlos Vela, Hector Bellerin, Robin van Persie, Gabriel Martinelli, William Saliba and Kieran Tierney.

In 2020, he became the Technical Director of the Football Federation of Chile where he worked for two years.

In 2023, he became the Global Director of Galatasaray in Turkey.

In January 2025, he became Sporting Director at FC Spartak Moscow.

== Honours ==
=== Club ===
Arsenal

- FA Youth Cup: 1988
