= Tom Walley =

Welsh footballer and coach (born 1945)

Personal information
- Full name: John Thomas Walley
- Date of birth: 27 February 1945 (age 81)
- Place of birth: Caernarfon, Wales
- Position: Wing half

Senior career*
Years	Team	Apps	(Gls)
1963–1964	Caernarfon Town	18	(5)
1964	Wrexham		
1964	Caernarfon Town	15	(4)
1964–1967	Arsenal	14	(1)
1967–1971	Watford	204	(17)
1971–1976	Orient	157	(6)
1976–1978	Watford	13	(0)

International career
	Wales under-23	4	
1971	Wales	1	(0)
- * Club domestic league appearances and goals

John Thomas Walley (born 27 February 1945) is a Welsh former footballer, who played as a wing half.

== Playing career ==
Walley was born in Caernarfon and educated at Ysgol Segontium, named after the town's Roman fort. At the age of 14, he underwent a neck operation which prevented him playing football for almost three years. In March 1963, he joined Caernarfon Town playing in the Welsh League (North); after only a handful of games, he briefly joined Wrexham in the spring of 1964, but returned to Caernarfon in August, before (on the recommendation of his elder brother Ernie, who was a former Spurs player) joining English side Arsenal in December 1964 for a fee of £1,000. He played for Arsenal 18 times—4 of those appearances as a substitute—and scored once, as well as playing for the Wales under-23 national team, before transferring to Watford in March 1967 for £9,500.

During the first of two periods Walley would spend at Vicarage Road as a player, he earned his sole cap for the Wales national football team; a 3–1 defeat to Czechoslovakia at Vetch Field, Swansea on 21 April 1971. After making over 200 Football League appearances for Watford, he was sold to Orient at the end of 1971 for £22,500. After 157 league games and 6 goals, Orient sold Walley back to Watford for £3,000 at the end of 1975–76. His second period at the club was dogged by injury, and Walley managed only 13 further league games before retiring in 1977.

== Coaching career ==
Upon his retirement from playing, Walley became the youth coach at Watford in August 1977. In his early years, players such as Kenny Jackett and Nigel Callaghan progressed to the first team. Under his management, Watford won the FA Youth Cup in 1982. Players in that side included future England international John Barnes, future Watford captain, Player of the Season and one-club man Nigel Gibbs, and 1984 FA Cup Finalist Neil Price. They again reached the final in 1985. Walley was promoted to first-team coach in 1988 by manager Steve Harrison. When Harrison moved to Millwall in 1990, Walley joined him as a youth coach, and in his first full season Walley lifted the FA Youth Cup for the second time in 1991. Just as he did at Watford, he followed this with a second final three years later. Walley left Millwall to join Arsenal in 1996, serving under Bruce Rioch and Arsène Wenger. In 1996, he was appointed manager of the Wales under-21 team by Bobby Gould.

== Personal life ==
Walley, whose first language is Welsh, was born in the town of Caernarfon, in Gwynedd, north west Wales. His older brother Ernie was also a professional footballer and coach. Ernie briefly managed Crystal Palace in 1980, and coached Watford's reserves while Walley was a first team coach at the club. He now lives in the Nascot area of Watford, Hertfordshire.
