= Paul Jones (footballer, born 1974) =

English footballer

Personal information
- Full name: Paul Timothy Jones
- Date of birth: 6 February 1974 (age 52)
- Place of birth: Solihull, England
- Position: Winger

Youth career
- 1990–1992: Birmingham City

Senior career*
Years	Team	Apps	(Gls)
1992–1993	Birmingham City	1	(0)
1993–????	Moor Green		
- * Club domestic league appearances and goals

Paul Timothy Jones (born 6 February 1974) is an English former professional footballer who played in the Football League for Birmingham City.

Jones was born in Solihull, West Midlands. When he left school in 1990, he joined Birmingham City as a YTS trainee, and turned professional two years later. A winger, he made his first and only Football League appearance in the Third Division on 14 September 1991, coming on as substitute for the injured Foley Okenla in a 1–1 draw at home to Peterborough United. His only other first-team game was in the League Cup, also as a substitute, and he left to join Moor Green in the 1993 close season.
