= Alan O'Neill (footballer, born 1973) =

Irish footballer

Personal information
- Full name: Alan O'Neill
- Date of birth: 27 August 1973 (age 53)
- Place of birth: Cork, Ireland
- Position: Forward

Senior career*
Years	Team	Apps	(Gls)
1990–1991	Cork City		
1991–1992	Cobh Ramblers		
1992–1993	Birmingham City	4	(0)
1993–19??	Cobh Ramblers		
- * Club domestic league appearances and goals

Alan O'Neill (born 27 August 1973) is an Irish former professional footballer who played in the Football League for Birmingham City. He also played in Ireland.

== Career ==
O'Neill was born in Cork. A forward, he played in Ireland for Cork City and Cobh Ramblers before coming to England to sign for Birmingham City in February 1992 for a fee of £15,000. He made his debut in the Football League Third Division on 29 February 1992, coming on as a substitute in a home game against Stoke City which finished as a 1–1 draw. He played in three more league games during the 1991–92 season, but dropped out of consideration when the club were promoted, and returned to Ireland in 1993.
