= Steve Redmond =

English footballer (born 1967)

Personal information
- Full name: Stephen Redmond
- Date of birth: 2 November 1967 (age 58)
- Place of birth: Liverpool, England
- Height: 5 ft 11 in (1.80 m)
- Position: Central defender

Youth career
- 1982–1984: Manchester City

Senior career*
Years	Team	Apps	(Gls)
1984–1992	Manchester City	235	(7)
1992–1998	Oldham Athletic	205	(4)
1998–2003	Bury	151	(6)
2003	Burscough	1	(0)
2003–2004	Leigh RMI	25	(1)
Total		617	(18)

International career
1986	England U18	5	(0)
1988–1989	England U21	14	(0)

Managerial career
- 1999–2000: Bury (joint caretaker-manager)
- * Club domestic league appearances and goals

Stephen Redmond (born 2 November 1967) is an English former professional footballer who played as a central defender for Manchester City, Oldham Athletic and Bury. Captain of the Manchester City youth team that won the 1986 FA Youth Cup, Redmond made his first-team debut at 18. He quickly established himself in the side, and was named the club's Player of the Year in 1988. The same year, he became the youngest ever Manchester City captain. Between 1987 and 1990 he played every single game in three straight seasons.

Redmond transferred to Oldham Athletic in 1992, where he spent six years. He then played for Bury for five seasons, and also had a period as caretaker-manager in the 1999–2000 season. He left Bury in 2003, and spent a season in non-league football before retiring.

== Career ==
Born in Liverpool, Redmond signed schoolboy forms with Manchester City in October 1982, choosing City ahead of his hometown club Liverpool. As a junior, he played for Blue Star, a Manchester City affiliated team based in Cheadle. His Blue Star teammates included Paul Lake, Andy Hinchcliffe and Ian Brightwell. He signed his first professional contract in November 1984.

Redmond was part of a promising group of young players from the same intake, of whom he and Paul Moulden were the first to play for the first team. His debut came in February 1986, against Queen's Park Rangers. In total he made eight senior appearances that season, including the final of the 1986 Full Members Cup. At the same time, Redmond was also captain of the youth team, who progressed to the final of the FA Youth Cup. In the final, City beat local rivals Manchester United over two legs, and as captain it was Redmond who lifted the trophy.

In the 1986–87 season, Redmond made 32 first team appearances, mainly at centre-half, but also sometimes as a sweeper. He also played enough reserve matches to claim a Central League winner's medal. The first team fared less well, and were relegated to the Second Division at the end of the season. As the club season came to a close, Redmond received a call-up to the England under-19 team for a tour of South America.

In the Second Division, Redmond was first-choice centre-half, and started every game. This included a 10–1 victory against Huddersfield Town that was the club's biggest win in the 20th Century, and a goalscoring tally that has not been equalled in English professional football since. At the end of the season he was voted the club's Player of the Year. Club captain Kenny Clements left Manchester City in the 1988 close season, and Redmond was appointed as his successor. At 20, he became the club's youngest ever captain. He again started every single match, as Manchester City gained promotion to the First Division. A third season as an ever-present followed in 1989–90. He continued to play regularly until March 1992, when he lost his place to Michel Vonk, and was transfer-listed shortly thereafter.

Redmond received his first call-up to the England under-21 team in 1988, and later captained the side. Redmond was the first player from Manchester City's 1986 Youth Cup winning squad to gain under-21 honours, though several others soon followed. In October 1988 five of them were called up at the same time: Redmond, Ian Brightwell, Andy Hinchcliffe, Paul Lake and David White.

In total Redmond played for Manchester City 287 times and scored seven goals. In August 1992 he transferred to Oldham Athletic. Redmond and Neil Pointon went from City to Oldham in exchange for Rick Holden and £300,000. Redmond was part of the Oldham team that reached the FA Cup semi-final in 1994, but Redmond missed the semi-final itself through suspension. He played 239 times for Oldham between 1992 and 1998, and scored four goals. In summer 1998 he joined former Oldham manager Neil Warnock at Bury, on a Bosman transfer. When Warnock left the club in December 1999, Redmond and Andy Preece became joint caretaker-managers. Preece was appointed manager on a permanent basis at the end of the season, and Redmond became player-assistant manager. After five years at Bury, Redmond ended his career with a spell in non-league football. He played a single game for Burscough, and then joined Leigh RMI of the Football Conference in August 2003, and spent a season at the club.

At the time of an interview in June 2011, Redmond was working for a builder's merchant, Travis Perkins. Redmond has three children. His son, Daniel, is also a professional footballer, who plays in the Welsh Premier League, for TNS.

== Honours ==
Manchester City

- Full Members' Cup runner-up: 1985–86
