= James Meara =

English footballer

Jim Meara
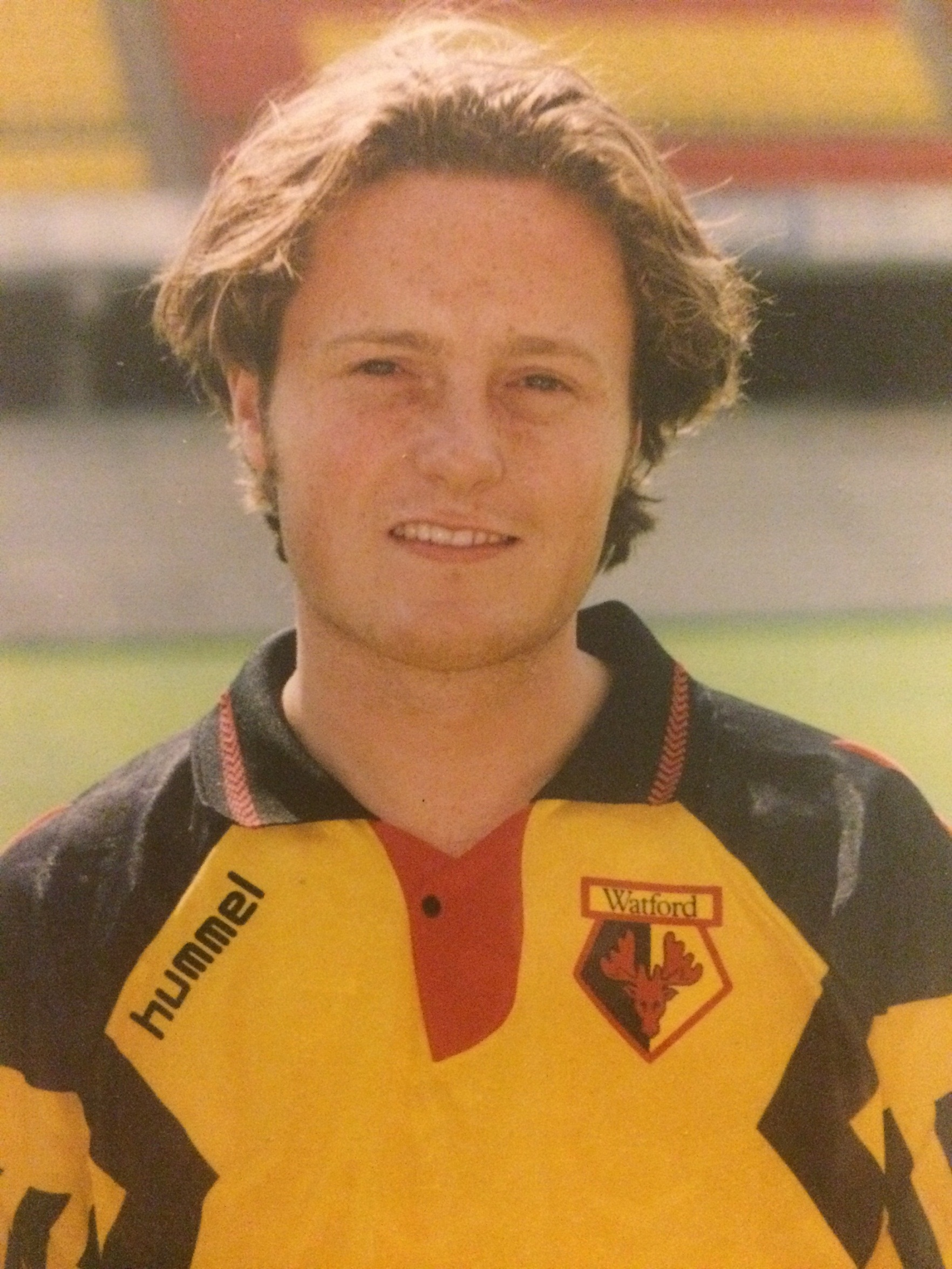

Personal information
- Full name: James Stephen Meara
- Date of birth: 7 October 1972 (age 54)
- Place of birth: Hammersmith, England
- Position: Midfielder

James Stephen Meara (born 7 October 1972) is an English former footballer who played for Watford and Doncaster Rovers as a midfielder.

== Biography ==
He was born in Hammersmith, West London and lived there until the age of 9 when he moved out to Hertfordshire. He joined Watford as a 10 year old at their academy and progressed through the years to the age of 16. As a 16 year old he was involved in the squad that won the FA Youth Cup in 1989, beating Manchester City in the final. The next year he was offered a two-year full-time Academy Player position at Watford which he accepted.

After the two year academy contract Meara signed and played as a professional at the club for the next three years. He made his professional debut away at Tranmere Rovers FC in the 1992-93 season. At the end of his fourteen-year association with the club he signed a two-year contract at Doncaster Rovers. The following years Meara played semi pro in England and acquired his coaching licenses.

In 2002, he moved to America. He has served as Regional Director at MLS Camps, held Director of Coaching Positions at youth soccer clubs and coached at the Olympic Development Program and PDL level. He serves as the co-founder and co-president at Pittsburgh Soccer in the Community, a non profit organization. He is an academy director for USL Pro Club Pittsburgh Riverhounds. Meara is also a partner with the former West Ham United and Manchester City player Ian Bishop in the soccer consultancy company Blue Moon International. He is also the founder of ZoneKone LLC, a sports training product.
