= Ken Hughes (footballer) =

Welsh footballer

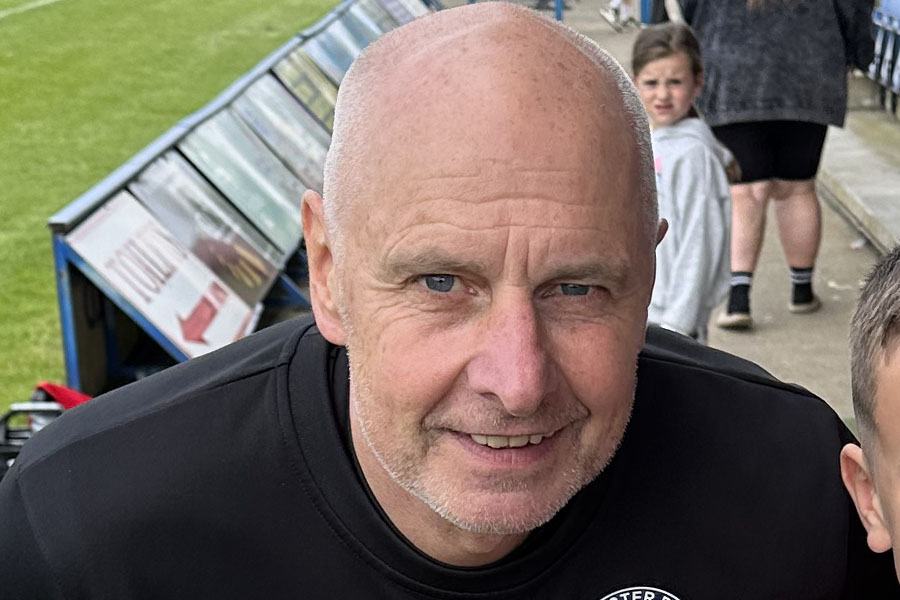
- Hughes in July 2023

Personal information
- Full name: Kenneth David Hughes
- Date of birth: 9 January 1966 (age 60)
- Place of birth: Barmouth, Wales, United Kingdom
- Position: Goalkeeper

Youth career
- Crystal Palace

Senior career*
Years	Team	Apps	(Gls)
1985–1986	Crystal Palace	0	(0)
1986–1992	Shrewsbury Town	74	(0)
1992–1993	Wrexham	8	(0)
- Telford United
- * Club domestic league appearances and goals

Kenneth David Hughes (born 9 January 1966) is a Welsh former professional footballer, who played as a goalkeeper. A product of the Crystal Palace youth squad, he made appearances in the English Football League for Shrewsbury Town and Wrexham. He also played non-league football for Telford United.
