= Aidan Murphy (footballer) =

English footballer (born 1967)

Personal information
- Full name: Aidan Murphy
- Date of birth: 17 September 1967 (age 59)
- Place of birth: Manchester, England
- Height: 6 ft 00 in (1.83 m)
- Position: Midfielder

Youth career
- 1983–1986: Manchester United

Senior career*
Years	Team	Apps	(Gls)
1986–1987	Manchester United	0	(0)
1986–1987	→ Lincoln City (loan)	2	(0)
1986–1987	→ Oldham Athletic (loan)	0	(0)
1987–1992	Crewe Alexandra	113	(13)
1992–1993	Scarborough	8	(0)
1992–1993	Woking	2	(0)
1992–1993	Mossley	6	(2)
1992–1993	Witton Albion	4	(0)
1993–1996	Carolina Dynamo	54	(4)
- Minnesota Rampage
- Raleigh Flyers

International career
1983	England Schoolboys	4	
1984–1986	England Youth International	8	
- * Club domestic league appearances and goals

Aidan Murphy (born 17 September 1967) is an English former professional footballer who made 123 appearances in the Football League.

== Player ==
Murphy, a midfielder, signed a professional contract with Manchester United on his 17th birthday. He was part of the FA Youth Cup team that played Manchester City in the 1986 FA Youth Cup Final. In October 1986 he spent a month on loan with Lincoln City, making his league debut in the 4–1 home defeat to Hartlepool United on 5 October 1986. In February 1987, he linked up with Oldham Athletic, again on a one-month loan deal, but failed to make a league appearance.

In the summer of 1987, Murphy was released by Manchester United and joined Crewe Alexandra where he was to spend the next five seasons. He had 113 league appearances. A short spell with Scarborough at the beginning of the 1992–1993 season signalled the end of his league career and he dropped into the non-league ranks to enjoy short spells with Woking, Mossley and Witton Albion.

In 1993, he emigrated to America and joined the Greensboro-based Carolina Dynamo for their inaugural season. He went on to spend three seasons in their team before moving on to spells with Minnesota Rampage and Raleigh Flyers. On 19 March 1998, he joined the Minnesota Thunder. He retired at the end of the season.
