= Bill Coldwell =

English manager, and scout (1932–1995)

William Rodney Coldwell (4 June 1932 – 8 December 1995) was an English football manager and scout.

Born in Petersfield, Hampshire, Coldwell played football for Weymouth and also played two first-class cricket matches for the MCC against Cambridge University in the mid-1950s.

He was employed as a scout by Birmingham City, but acted as caretaker manager on two occasions. The first time was for three games between the departure of Dave Mackay and the arrival of Lou Macari in early 1991; Birmingham remained unbeaten under his management. After Macari walked out in June 1991 to join Stoke City, Coldwell again took over as caretaker, this time persuading a significant number of out-of-contract players to re-sign (and not leave the club with Macari), and supervising pre-season training until the appointment of Terry Cooper in August 1991.

In April 1993 he replaced Len Ashurst as manager of Southern League Weymouth. Unable to prevent relegation to the Southern Division, he stabilised the club and achieved a mid-table finish with a young side in the 1992–93 season, but was sacked in September 1993.

Coldwell died in Bristol at the age of 63.
