= Darren Oldroyd =

English footballer

Personal information
- Date of birth: 1 November 1966 (age 59)
- Place of birth: Ormskirk, England
- Position: Defender

Senior career*
Years	Team	Apps	(Gls)
1984–1985	Everton	1	(0)
1986–1987	Wolverhampton Wanderers	11	(0)
- Southport
- * Club domestic league appearances and goals

Darren Oldroyd (born 1 November 1966) is an English former footballer who played in the Football League for Everton and Wolverhampton Wanderers.
