= David Foy =

English footballer (born 1972)

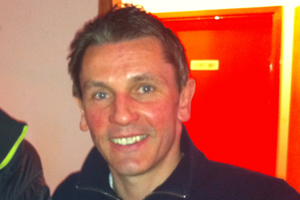

Personal information
- Full name: David Lee Foy
- Date of birth: 20 October 1972 (age 54)
- Place of birth: Coventry, England
- Position: Midfielder

Youth career
- 1898–1991: Birmingham City

Senior career*
Years	Team	Apps	(Gls)
1991–1993	Birmingham City	3	(0)
1992	→ Cobh Ramblers (loan)		
1993	Scunthorpe United	3	(0)
1993–1994	Stafford Rangers	35	(2)
1994–2002	Tamworth		
2002–2004	Worcester City		
2004	→ Halesowen Town (loan)		
2004–2005	Moor Green		
2004–200?	→ Stratford Town (loan)		
2005–2006	Bedworth United		
2006–2008	Stratford Town		
- * Club domestic league appearances and goals

David Lee Foy (born 20 October 1972) is an English former professional footballer who played as a midfielder in the Football League for Birmingham City and Scunthorpe United. After playing in the Football League he had a long career in non-League football.

== Football career ==
Foy was born in Coventry. He joined Birmingham City as a trainee in 1979, and turned professional two years later. He made his first-team debut as a substitute in the League Cup in November 1991, and the following year spent time on loan at League of Ireland club Cobh Ramblers. Foy made his Football League debut in the First Division (second tier) on 13 February 1993 in a 3–2 home defeat to Portsmouth. He started the next two games, but soon afterwards was allowed to leave for Scunthorpe United on a free transfer. In his debut game he made a late goalline clearance which earned his club a 0–0 draw against Wrexham, but Scunthorpe released him at the end of the season and he joined Stafford Rangers.

After something over a season in the Conference with Stafford, Foy joined Tamworth, where he spent seven years. In his final season the club narrowly failed to win the Southern League league title, and Foy, not selected for the last few games of the campaign, was frustrated by his inability to contribute. In May 2002 he left Tamworth for Worcester City. Foy damaged a cruciate ligament only ten games into his Worcester career, and his two years at the club was disrupted by injury. He spent the last few months of the 2003–04 season on loan to Halesowen Town before being released by Worcester. He joined Conference North club Moor Green, but by December 2004 was being loaned out to Stratford Town of the Midland Alliance, and moved on to Southern League Division One West club Bedworth United at the end of the season. However, Foy's domestic circumstances meant that in March 2006 he chose to make a permanent move to Stratford Town to reduce the amount of travelling required. After rejoining Stratford Town in 2008, Foy made a total of 51 appearances (39 in the league) across all three spells, scoring twice (both in the league).
