= Eric Hogan =

Irish footballer (born 1971)

Personal information
- Full name: Thomas Eric Hogan
- Date of birth: 18 December 1971 (age 54)
- Place of birth: Cork, Ireland
- Position: Forward

Youth career
- FAI School of Excellence
- Rockmount

Senior career*
Years	Team	Apps	(Gls)
1990–1991	Cobh Ramblers	27	(5)
1991–1992	Birmingham City	1	(0)
1992	→ Cobh Ramblers (loan)	6	(0)
1992–1993	Shamrock Rovers	12	(2)
1993–1994	Cobh Ramblers	5	(0)
- * Club domestic league appearances and goals

Thomas Eric Hogan (born 18 December 1971) is an Irish former professional footballer who played in the League of Ireland for Cobh Ramblers and Shamrock Rovers, and in the Football League in England for Birmingham City.

Hogan was born in Cork. He attended the Football Association of Ireland (FAI) School of Excellence, played for Rockmount , and represented Cork AUL in the FAI youths inter-league competition alongside Rockmount clubmate Roy Keane. He moved on to play semi-professionally for Cobh Ramblers while employed in an aluminium factory, making his League of Ireland debut on 7 October 1990 at St. Colman's Park against Finn Harps.

After a trial with Birmingham City during their Irish tour in the summer of 1991, Hogan signed for the club for a fee of £30,000. He made his debut in the Third Division on 14 December 1991, coming on as substitute for Louie Donowa in a 2–1 defeat away to A.F.C. Bournemouth. He played only once more for the first team, in the Football League Trophy in January 1992, also as a substitute, before returning to Cobh Ramblers on loan the following month, and returning to Ireland permanently in September 1992 when he signed for Shamrock Rovers. In the 1993 close season he rejoined Cobh Ramblers, and in 1994 joined College Corinthians.
