= Phil Hughes (footballer) =

Northern Irish footballer

Personal information
- Full name: Philip Anthony Hughes
- Date of birth: 19 November 1964 (age 61)
- Place of birth: Belfast, Northern Ireland
- Height: 5 ft 11 in (1.80 m)
- Position: Goalkeeper

Youth career
- 1981–1983: Manchester United

Senior career*
Years	Team	Apps	(Gls)
1983–1985	Leeds United	6	(0)
1985–1987	Bury	80	(0)
1987–1991	Wigan Athletic	99	(0)
1991	Rochdale	0	(0)
1991–1992	Scarborough	17	(0)
	Guiseley	?	(?)
Total		202	(0)

International career
1986–1987	Northern Ireland	3	(0)
- * Club domestic league appearances and goals

Philip Anthony Hughes (born 19 November 1964) is a Northern Ireland former international footballer who played as a goalkeeper.

He left school in 1981 to sign for Manchester United as an apprentice, keeping goal as they finished FA Youth Cup runners-up in 1982, but leaving the following year without signing a professional contract. A two-year spell at Leeds United followed, after which he spent two years at Bury and four years at Wigan Athletic, before finishing his career in the mid-1990s with Scarborough. He earned three caps for the Northern Ireland national football team between 1986 and 1987, and was included in the 1986 FIFA World Cup team as a back-up goalkeeper. Since his retirement from professional football in 1992, Hughes has worked as a goalkeeping coach for a number of clubs. While playing part-time for Guiseley, he also worked as a policeman.

== Club career ==
As a teenager, Hughes played for junior teams at Burnley during the school holidays. Hughes' senior career began when he was signed as an apprentice for the youth team at Manchester United in 1981 after leaving school. In the 1981–82 the youth side reached the final of the FA Youth Cup. Hughes started in goal in both legs of the tie but the team were defeated 6–7 on aggregate by Watford. Despite being a promising young goalkeeper, he failed to obtain a professional contract or make a first team appearance for the club and left in January 1983 to sign for Football League Second Division outfit Leeds United on a free transfer.

Hughes did not play any matches in his first six months at Leeds and during the 1983–84 campaign he appeared in just two first-team games as he remained an understudy to Scotland international goalkeeper David Harvey. He played four league matches and one FA Cup tie the following season before the signature of Mervyn Day spelled the end of Hughes' Leeds United career. He left the club in the summer of 1985 and transferred to Third Division side Bury. He played more than 50 games during the 1985–86 season as Bury struggled to a 20th-place finish in the division. In spite of the team's poor league position, Hughes was selected for the Northern Ireland squad for the 1986 FIFA World Cup. He played 32 league matches the following season before a serious shoulder injury curtailed his campaign. His form never fully returned after the injury and he was allowed to join Third Division rivals Wigan Athletic for a transfer fee of £35,000 in November 1987.

Hughes became first choice custodian at Wigan and made 31 league appearances in the remainder of the 1987–88 season as the side finished seventh in the table. In April 1988, during the Football League Centenary Tournament at Wembley, he saved a spot kick to knock out Sunderland in a penalty shootout. He went on to play a total of 99 league games for Wigan Athletic before leaving to sign for Rochdale on a free transfer in 1991. His stay at Rochdale was brief, however, and soon after his arrival he was released by the club and joined Football League Fourth Division club Scarborough. He played 21 matches for the club before his career was ended prematurely when he suffered a dislocated shoulder and was forced to retire from professional football at the age of 26. After recovering from the injury, he briefly played semi-professional football for Northern Premier League outfit Guiseley.

== International career ==
Hughes played a number of matches at various youth levels for Northern Ireland. He was first called up to the senior Northern Ireland squad in late 1984 but did not play for the team at that time. Following his performances for Bury, manager Billy Bingham included Hughes in the 22-man squad for the 1986 FIFA World Cup in Mexico. However, he was restricted to a place on the bench as Pat Jennings kept goal throughout the tournament. Jennings retired following the competition and Hughes became first choice goalkeeper. He made his international debut on 15 October 1986 in the 0–3 loss to England at Wembley. In the process, he became the only Bury goalkeeper to ever win international caps while playing for the club. He kept a clean sheet his second game for Northern Ireland as the side secured a 0–0 draw away at Turkey in a qualifier for UEFA Euro 1988. His final international appearance came on 18 February 1987 as the team drew 1–1 with Israel in a friendly. The shoulder injury he incurred playing for Wigan Athletic kept him out of the Northern Ireland setup and his place in the team was taken by George Dunlop.

== After playing ==
While playing part-time for Guiseley, Hughes worked as a policeman. He obtained his first coaching job at his former team, Leeds United, where he was hired to train the goalkeepers at the club, including England international Scott Carson. He later moved to Grimsby Town where he worked with Wales stopper Danny Coyne. He followed Coyne to Football League Championship side Burnley where he was appointed goalkeeper coach in 2004. On 6 January 2010, Hughes was named as temporary assistant to caretaker manager Steve Davis after manager Owen Coyle was placed on 'gardening leave'. He left Burnley on 10 January 2009 to follow Coyle to Premier League rivals Bolton Wanderers.

In 2012, he left Bolton after the dismissal of Owen Coyle and was replaced by Lee Turner but he wasn't out of the game for long, re-joining former club Wigan Athletic in the summer of 2013 shortly after Coyle was installed as manager of The Latics. 2016 Hughes joined Blackburn Rovers as Head Goalkeeping Coach In 2018, he joined FC Halifax Town as the Assistant Manager/Goalkeeping Coach to Manager Jamie Fullarton.
