= Dennis Cronin =

English footballer

Personal information
- Date of birth: 30 October 1967 (age 58)
- Place of birth: Altrincham, England
- Height: 1.80 m (5 ft 11 in)
- Position: Forward

Youth career
- Years: Team
- 1984–1986: Manchester United

Dennis Cronin (born 30 October 1967) is an English former professional footballer.

== Player ==
Born in Altrincham, Cronin signed a professional contract with Manchester United on his 17th birthday. He was part of the FA Youth Cup team that played Manchester City in the 1986 FA Youth Cup Final.

In the summer of 1987, Cronin was released by Manchester United and joined Crewe Alexandra where he was to spend the next season. He made 15 league appearances and transferred to Stockport County the following summer before moving to non-league Northwich Victoria.
