= Neil Morris =

English footballer

Personal information
- Full name: Neil Anthony Morris
- Date of birth: 3 May 1970 (age 56)
- Place of birth: Sheffield, West Riding of Yorkshire, England
- Height: 6 ft 2 in (1.88 m)
- Position: Striker

Youth career
- –1988: Doncaster Rovers

Senior career*
Years	Team	Apps	(Gls)
1988–1989	York City	4	(0)
- Worksop Town
1992–	Doncaster Rovers	1	(0)
- Worksop Town
Total		5	(0)
- * Club domestic league appearances and goals

Neil Anthony Morris (born 3 May 1970) is an English former professional footballer who played as a striker in the Football League for York City and Doncaster Rovers, and in non-League football for Worksop Town.
