= David Boyd (footballer) =

Scottish footballer

Personal information
- Full name: David Boyd
- Date of birth: 7 November 1870
- Place of birth: Troon, Scotland
- Date of death: 22 October 1909 (aged 38)
- Position: Inside forward

Senior career*
Years	Team	Apps	(Gls)
1892–1893	Troon		
1892–1893	Abercorn		
1893–1896	Rangers	27	(8)
1896–1898	Preston North End	37	(14)
1898–1899	Third Lanark	3	(2)
1899–1900	Abercorn		
1900	Linfield		
Total		57	(22)
- * Club domestic league appearances and goals

David Boyd (7 November 1870 – 22 October 1909) was a Scottish footballer who played in the Football League for Preston North End.
