= Peter Docherty =

English footballer (1929–1957)

Personal information
- Full name: Peter Docherty
- Date of birth: 14 February 1929
- Place of birth: Hebburn, England
- Date of death: 1957
- Place of death: Darlington, England
- Position: Outside forward

Senior career*
Years	Team	Apps	(Gls)
1949–1950	Fulham	0	(0)
1950–1951	Darlington	3	(1)
- * Club domestic league appearances and goals

Peter Docherty (14 February 1929 – 1957) was an English footballer who played as an outside forward in the Football League for Darlington.

Docherty signed for First Division club Fulham in September 1949, but he never represented them in the league, and returned to his native north-east of England and signed for Darlington a year later. Standing in for regular outside left Gordon Galley, Docherty scored on his senior debut, on 7 October 1950 in a 1–1 draw at home to Tranmere Rovers in the Third Division North. He kept his place for the next match, and made his third and final appearance in February 1951.

Docherty was born in 1929 in Hebburn, which was then part of County Durham, and died in Darlington in 1957.
