= Neill Rimmer =

English footballer and manager

Personal information
- Date of birth: 13 November 1967 (age 58)
- Place of birth: Liverpool, England
- Height: 5 ft 6 in (1.68 m)
- Position: Midfielder

Youth career
- Everton

Senior career*
Years	Team	Apps	(Gls)
1984–1985	Everton	1	(0)
1985–1988	Ipswich Town	22	(3)
1988–1996	Wigan Athletic	220	(10)
1996–1997	Altrincham	5	(0)
- Scarborough
Total		218	(13)

International career
1984	England Youth	1	(0)

Managerial career
- 2017–: Ashton Town
- * Club domestic league appearances and goals

Neill Rimmer (born 13 November 1967) is an English former professional football midfielder. He played in the Football League primarily for Wigan Athletic.

== Playing career ==
Born in Liverpool, Rimmer became an apprentice with Everton, turning professional in April 1984. He made one first team appearance for Everton, as a substitute, before being released at the end of the 1984–85 season. In August 1985 he joined Ipswich Town, but made less than 30 first team appearances over the next three seasons. In July 1988 he joined Wigan Athletic. During the 1990–91 season he had a spell on loan with Mossley, playing three times. He returned to Wigan and went on to make over 250 first team appearances.

He later played for Altrincham, where he played five times in the Football Conference during the 1996–97 season and Scarborough.

== Coaching career ==
From September 2009 to June 2010, Neill ran developmental programs for Lincoln Youth Soccer in Lincoln, Massachusetts in the USA. He later worked for the Wigan Athletic academy as a coach.

In June 2017 he was appointed joint manager of Ashton Town alongside Dave Dempsey.
