= Andy Hinchcliffe =

English footballer (born 1969)

Personal information
- Full name: Andrew George Hinchcliffe
- Date of birth: 5 February 1969 (age 57)
- Place of birth: Manchester, England
- Height: 5 ft 10 in (1.78 m)
- Position: Left-back

Youth career
- –1986: Manchester City

Senior career*
Years	Team	Apps	(Gls)
1986–1990	Manchester City	112	(8)
1990–1998	Everton	182	(7)
1998–2002	Sheffield Wednesday	86	(7)
Total		380	(22)

International career
1986	England Youth	6	(0)
1988	England U21	1	(0)
1996–1998	England	7	(0)
- * Club domestic league appearances and goals

Andrew George Hinchcliffe (born 5 February 1969) is an English former professional footballer. He is now a television pundit and match summariser for Sky Sports.

As a player, he was a left-back from 1986 until 2002. He began his career with Manchester City in the old First Division but later played in the Premier League for both Everton and Sheffield Wednesday. He was part of the Everton side that lifted the FA Cup in 1995. He was also capped seven times by England between 1996 and 1998 having initially won a single cap for the England U21 team.

== Playing career ==
For much of his early life, Hinchcliffe played for Manchester City's academy, coming through with a number of other players who would go on to establish themselves for City's senior side. In 1986 he was part of the side that won the club's first-ever FA Youth Cup trophy, playing in a team that also featured Ian Brightwell, Steve Redmond, David White, Paul Lake and Paul Moulden, and which was managed by club legend Tony Book.

Having started his career with City he established himself as the club's first-choice left-back. Whilst at City, Hinchcliffe was one of the scorers in the Manchester derby on 23 September 1989 in a 5–1 victory over Manchester United. Hinchcliffe won the 1995 FA Cup while with Everton and enjoyed the best form of his career at the club, winning seven full England caps. His England debut came in a 3–0 away victory over Moldova on 1 September 1996, in what was manager Glenn Hoddle's first game in charge.

After injuring his cruciate ligament in December 1996, Hinchcliffe did not return until September 1997, with Everton then under new management after Howard Kendall had replaced Joe Royle. Kendall was not known to be a big Hinchliffe fan, having sold him previously whilst Manchester City manager. He was subsequently sold by the Toffees to Sheffield Wednesday five months into Kendall's reign for £2.65m where he played for a further four years.

Hinchcliffe retired from playing football in March 2002 following surgery on his left knee. He only made two appearances in his final season at the club (2001–02), one of which was in the League Cup semifinal first leg against Blackburn Rovers, the other in the league against Crewe Alexandra.

== Media career ==
Hinchcliffe now works as a co-commentator on Sky Sports. He does co-commentary for both Premier League and Championship games, as well as some Manchester City games in the Women's Super League. He also sometimes appears on Sky Sports News in the morning with other football guests to talk about transfers and games that have gone on recently.

== Personal life ==
Hinchcliffe was educated at Manchester's William Hulme's Grammar School for Boys, a rugby-playing school.

== Honours ==
Manchester City Youth

- FA Youth Cup: 1985–86

Everton

- FA Cup: 1994–95
- FA Charity Shield: 1995
- Full Members' Cup runner-up: 1990–91

Individual

- PFA Team of the Year: 1987–88 Second Division
