= Ray Lee =

English footballer

Personal information
- Full name: Raymond Maurice Lee
- Date of birth: 19 September 1970 (age 56)
- Place of birth: Bristol, England
- Position: Right winger

Youth career
- 1986–1988: Arsenal

Senior career*
| Years | Team | Apps | (Gls) |
| 1988–1990 | Arsenal | 0 | (0) |
| 1990 | Swindon Town | 0 | (0) |
| 1990–1991 | Scarborough | 10 | (0) |
| 1991 | Redbridge Forest | | |
| 1991–1992 | Chelmsford City | 26 | (1) |
| 1992–1994 | Heybridge Swifts | | |
- * Club domestic league appearances and goals

Raymond Maurice Lee (born 19 September 1970) is an English former footballer who played as a right winger.

== Career ==
In 1986, Lee joined Arsenal as an apprentice. Lee spent four years at Arsenal, before being released in 1990. Following a stint with Swindon Town, where he failed to make an appearance, Lee signed for Scarborough. During the 1990–91 season, Lee made 10 Fourth Division appearances for Scarborough, before moving to Redbridge Forest. In 1991, Lee joined Chelmsford City, making 26 appearances, scoring once. Following his spell at Chelmsford, Lee signed for Heybridge Swifts, remaining with the club until 1994.
