= Paul Shepstone =

English footballer

Personal information
- Full name: Paul Thomas Adam Shepstone
- Date of birth: 8 November 1970 (age 55)
- Place of birth: Coventry, Warwickshire, England
- Height: 5 ft 8 in (1.73 m)
- Position: Winger

Youth career
- 1986–1987: Coventry City

Senior career*
Years	Team	Apps	(Gls)
1987–1989	Coventry City	0	(0)
1989–1990	Birmingham City	0	(0)
1990	Atherstone United		
1990–1992	Blackburn Rovers	26	(1)
1992	→ York City (loan)	2	(0)
1992–1993	Motherwell	1	(0)
1993–1994	Stafford Rangers		
1994	Wycombe Wanderers		
1994–	Stafford Rangers		

International career
1989	England youth	1	(0)
- * Club domestic league appearances and goals

Paul Thomas Adam Shepstone (born 8 November 1970) is an English former professional footballer who played as a winger in the Football League for Blackburn Rovers and York City, in the Scottish Football League for Motherwell, in non-League football for Atherstone United, Stafford Rangers and Wycombe Wanderers, and was on the books of Coventry City and Birmingham City without making a league appearance. He earned one cap for the England national youth team in 1989.
