= Foley Okenla =

Nigerian footballer (born 1967)

Personal information
- Full name: Folorunso Okenla
- Date of birth: 9 October 1967 (age 59)
- Place of birth: Ibadan, Nigeria
- Position: Winger

Senior career*
Years	Team	Apps	(Gls)
1991	Burnley	0	(0)
1991–1992	Birmingham City	7	(1)
1992–1993	K.V. Turnhout	4	(0)
1993	Montreal Impact	7	(0)

International career
- Nigeria
- * Club domestic league appearances and goals

Folorunso "Foley" Okenla (born 9 October 1967) is a Nigerian retired professional footballer who played in England, Belgium and Canada.

== Career ==
Okenla was on the books of English club Burnley, without playing for them in the Football League, before making seven appearances in the Football League Third Division for Birmingham City on a non-contract basis. He later played in the Belgian Second Division for K.V. Turnhout and in the American Professional Soccer League for Canadian club the Montreal Impact.
