= Mark Metcalf (footballer) =

English footballer

Mark Peter Metcalf (born 25 September 1965) is an English centre-half who played during 1980s and 1990s. He made three appearances for England U17s

== Sources ==
- Mark Davage; John Eastwood; Kevin Platt (2001). Canary Citizens. Jarrold Publishing. ISBN 0-7117-2020-7.
- Career information at ex-canaries.co.uk
