= Neil Price (footballer) =

English footballer

Personal information
- Date of birth: 15 February 1964 (age 62)
- Place of birth: Hemel Hempstead, England
- Height: 5 ft 9 in (1.75 m)
- Position: Left back

Youth career
- Watford

Senior career*
| Years | Team | Apps | (Gls) |
| 1983–1985 | Watford | 8 | (0) |
| 1984 | → Plymouth Argyle (loan) | 1 | (0) |
| 1985 | → Blackpool (loan) | 13 | (0) |
| 1985–1986 | Swansea City | 3 | (0) |
| 1986–1988 | Wycombe Wanderers | | |
| 1989–1990 | Wealdstone | | |
| 1991–1992 | Staines Town | | |
| Total | | 25 | (0) |

Managerial career
- 1991–1992: Staines Town
- 1995–1997: Hendon
- Walton & Hersham
- Hemel Hempstead Town
- * Club domestic league appearances and goals

Neil Price (born 15 February 1964) is an English former professional footballer who played as a left back.

== Playing career ==
Born in Hemel Hempstead, Price played for Watford, Plymouth Argyle, Blackpool and Swansea City, making a total of 25 appearances in the Football League. He retired from professional football in 1988 due to a knee injury, and played non-league football with Wycombe Wanderers, Wealdstone and Staines Town.

At Watford he played two games in Watford's first (and as of 2012 only) season in the UEFA Cup, and seven of his eight league games were in the top division of English football. He also played in the 1984 FA Cup Final.

He joined Plymouth Argyle on loan in February 1984 alongside fellow Watford player Francis Cassidy, and made two appearances for them.

== Coaching career ==
After retiring as a player he worked as a manager. He was manager of Staines Town between July 1991 and January 1992. He was also in charge of Hendon, Walton & Hersham, reaching the FA Cup 1st rnd v Swansea and also gaining promotion in his first season. He was in charge of Hendon from 1995 to 1997. Also reaching round 1 of the FA Cup v Cardiff . He joined Hemel Hempstead Town gaining a promotion with them before leaving due to work commitments.

== Later life ==
Price later worked as a match commentator for BBC Three Counties Radio, and in 2013 he was running a pub with his brother. He now works as a football consultant for a London-based Agency as well as match day analyst for the PFA

== Honours ==
Watford

- FA Cup runner-up: 1983–84
