= Paul Lake =

English footballer (born 1968)

Personal information
- Full name: Paul Andrew Lake
- Date of birth: 28 October 1968 (age 57)
- Place of birth: Manchester, England
- Positions: Defender; midfielder

Youth career
- 1977–1980: Denton Youth
- 1980–1983: Blue Star
- 1983–1986: Manchester City

Senior career*
Years	Team	Apps	(Gls)
1986–1996	Manchester City	110	(7)

International career
1988–1989	England U21	5	(0)
1990	England B	1	(0)
- * Club domestic league appearances and goals

Paul Andrew Lake (born 28 October 1968) is an English former professional footballer who played for Manchester City and represented England at under-21 and B team level.

He had an excellent early career with Manchester City, winning the FA Youth Cup in 1986 and helping the club to win promotion out of the Second Division in 1988–89. However a ruptured Anterior cruciate ligament in September 1990 would lead to several seasons struggling with knee injuries, and he would only play four further games from that point before announcing his retirement in January 1996. Despite his career effectively ending at the age of 21 he was later inducted into the Manchester City Hall of Fame, and was seen as a player who would have been a key first team player for many years had it not been for his injury problems.

Lake went on to spend ten years as a physiotherapist in the game, working with Macclesfield Town and Bolton Wanderers. In 2008 he was recruited by Manchester City as its City in the Community Ambassador, helping to forge links with local charities. In 2013, he joined the Premier League as a Club Support Manager, liaising with various football academies across the north of England. He also works as a match day co-commentator for BBC Radio Manchester.

== Early life ==
Lake was born on 28 October 1968, five minutes before his twin sister Tracey, to Sheila McGinty (housewife) and Ted Lake (asphalt technician). He grew up in Haughton Green, though both his parents came from Ardwick. The twins were the younger siblings of Susan (born 1962), David (1964), and Michael (born 1966). Lake had a son Zachary Lake (1997) to his first wife Lisa Johnson Lake He had two sons named Edward Lake (2003) and Han Lake (2006) to his second wife. He spent all of his free time during childhood playing football. He grew up supporting Manchester City, as he was taken to games at Maine Road by the local milkman. His great-uncle George was on the books of Manchester City before the First World War.

== Club career ==
At the age of eight he played for the Denton Youth under-12 side. He won the 1980 Smiths Crisps Six-a-Side Championship with his school, St Mary's RC Primary (Denton), and scored the winning goal in the Wembley final against St Cuthbert's School (Sunderland). He was spotted by Manchester City scout Ted Davies playing for Denton Boys under-13s, who got him a place alongside Andy Hinchcliffe on Blue Star, a feeder team to Manchester City. Ian Brightwell later joined the team, though by then the club had changed its name to Midas, and later Pegasus. Lake became an associated schoolboy at City in July 1983, and signed a contract to become a Youth Training Scheme apprentice in July 1985. He won a treble in the 1985–86 season, as the reserve team won the Central League, the 'A' team won the Lancashire league title, and the youth team beat Manchester United in the FA Youth Cup final. He signed professional forms with the club on his 18th birthday.

Following an injury to David White, Lake was given his first-team debut by manager Jimmy Frizzell on 24 January 1987 in a 0–0 draw with Wimbledon at Plough Lane. He scored on his home debut on 21 February in a 1–1 draw with Luton Town. New manager Mel Machin gave him more of a run in the first team early in the 1987–88 season after centre-half Kenny Clements picked up an injury. On 7 November he featured in City's 10–1 victory over Huddersfield Town. He became a regular first team player, but missed the last three games of the season with a knee injury he picked up against Bradford City.

On 11 March 1989, he came close to death when he was knocked unconscious during a match against Leicester City and subsequently suffered with a blocked airway whilst lying on the ground. It had taken some minutes for the City doctor to make his way from the director's box to the pitch and as a result of the incident the Football Association changed their rules to ensure that club doctors must remain at pitch-side during games. He played in every outfield position throughout the 1988–89 campaign as City secured promotion out of the Second Division with a second-place finish.

Despite beating rivals Manchester United 5–1, the 1989–90 season saw City initially struggle to adapt to life back in the First Division after two seasons away. Machin was sacked in November 1989, and Lake later said that his replacement, Howard Kendall, was "the best boss I ever had". City ended the season in 14th place, five points above the relegation zone.

He was appointed as club captain for the 1990–91 season and was given a new five-year contract. However three games into his captaincy he picked up an injury against Aston Villa. An initial X-ray showed no broken bones and he was told it would take six weeks for the injury to heal. However, he broke down after initial straight line running work stepped up to include twisting and turning. An arthroscopy revealed a ruptured Anterior cruciate ligament (ACL), and he underwent pioneering surgery to reconstruct the ligament using tissue taken from the patella tendon of the same knee; he was initially given a six-month recovery time which could have seen him back in the team at the end of that season. However, when the time again came to train with a football his knee gave way once again.

He was declared fit to play again in June 1991 following months of recovery time at Lilleshall Hall. He re-ruptured his ligaments during pre-season training and had to undergo the knee operation for a second time, despite the fact the initial operation did not appear to have worked as expected. He spent the 1991–92 season back at Lilleshall, and by the end of his time there he had spent more time at the medical centre there than any other footballer.

He returned for pre-season training in June 1992, and he played in a number of pre-season friendlies without incident, though his knee still required a lengthy period of rest after matches. Manager Peter Reid stated that "it's like being handed a new £3 million player". He started the opening Premier League game of the 1992–93 season on 17 August, a 1–1 draw with Queens Park Rangers, but was substituted 60 minutes in after feeling pressure in his knee. Despite still feeling that his knee needed rest he went on to play against Middlesbrough at Ayresome Park two days later. Ten minutes into the game his ligament snapped for the third time and he was substituted off. Six weeks later he travelled to Los Angeles to see Dr Sisto, an expert on cruciate ligament injuries. Before going on the trip he told The Sunday People that the club and chairman Peter Swales had not handled his injury in the correct manner and left him feeling like "a piece of meat" as players at other clubs received specialist treatment straight away and received appearance and bonus pay during long-term absences. Despite Lake being alone in America, the club refused to pay for his girlfriend to fly out to LA to be with him during his recovery from surgery, and so Niall Quinn and Peter Reid organised a whip-round to pay for her flight tickets. The lack of leg room on the economy flight back to the UK also damaged his knee, though the club had flown the fully fit club physio back to England in business class.

"If I'd have seen you straight away you'd have been back playing soccer by now."

— Dr Domenick J. Sisto's remark to Lake upon initial examination of the knee in 1992.

He made brief reserve team appearances in early 1994, but was unable to participate beyond the spring as he was fitted with a knee brace to aid with his recovery. With the likelihood of a return to fitness seeming remote he resorted to trying holy water, acupuncture and faith healing, all to no effect. As the injury saga continued he began to suffer from depression, and he was put on a course of anti-depressants for a number of years. After years of operations his knee had numerous screws inserted and he needed surgery to re-straighten his leg; he remained on a lifelong prescription for anti-inflammatory painkillers. He retired from football in January 1996, after a struggle against injury which went on for more than five years, and was granted a testimonial game against Manchester United in October 1997. He was inducted into the Manchester City Hall of Fame in 2004.

"With my confidence shot and my career in tatters, I found myself trapped in a world of pain where, in the words of that old Sad Cafe song, every day hurt."

— One psychiatrist told Lake that the loss of his career had been like a bereavement to him.

== International career ==
Lake made his debut for the England under-21 side against Denmark in September 1988. He also featured in a 2–1 win over Albania on 7 March 1989, and a 2–1 victory over Poland; both of which were qualifying games for the 1990 UEFA European Under-21 Championship. However coach Lawrie McMenemy stated that Lake "always seemed to be injured at the time of important under-21 call-ups". In January 1990 England manager Bobby Robson named him in his 30-man provisional squad for the 1990 FIFA World Cup. He won a cap for the England B team against Ireland B in March 1990, playing in an unfamiliar role of wide-left in a 4–1 defeat. He was angered by manager Dave Sexton's decision to play him as a winger, feeling the game did not give a good chance to make a case for his inclusion in Robson's final World Cup squad. He did not make it into the World Cup squad and never won a senior cap.

== Post-retirement ==
Following his retirement from playing football, Lake used his experience on the treatment table to train to become a physiotherapist. He began working on the Manchester City medical team in 1997, and helped Richard Edghill to recover from the same injury that had claimed his own career. The following year he was appointed first team physio at Burnley. He went on to work as the physio at non-league club Altrincham, where he balanced the club's medical expenses on a tight budget. Like his previous positions, he remained at Altrincham for just one season, before moving on to Oldham Athletic. In 2003, he switched clubs to Macclesfield Town. He graduated with a degree in physiotherapy at Salford University in May 2003. In November 2007 he joined the medical staff at Bolton Wanderers. He left Bolton in 2008 and ran his own physiotherapy practice in Greater Manchester until March 2010, when he was appointed Ambassador for Manchester City in the Community. In June 2013, he stepped down as City's ambassador to take up a similar role with the Premier League.

== Personal life ==
He married Lisa Johnson in Denton in May 1995. The marriage was brief, but they welcomed a son, Zachary, in 1997. In 2001 he married Joanne Parker in Prestbury village, and in June 2003 the couple had a son, Edward, followed three years later by a second child, Han.

His brother Michael and niece and nephew Annabel Lake and Charles Lake, are also former professional footballers.

Paul's father, Ted, died in Tameside Hospital in 1997.

His acclaimed autobiography, "I'm Not Really Here", was published by Century in 2011. The book, co-written with his wife Joanne, became a Sunday Times best seller and was nominated for Football Book of the Year at the 2011 British Sports Book Awards.

Lake is patron of Jump Space, a Stockport-based charity that provides specialist trampolining and rebound therapy to disabled children and young people.

== Honours ==
Manchester City

- FA Youth Cup: 1986
- Football League Second Division runner-up: 1988–89
