= Kenny Clements =

English footballer and manager

Personal information
- Full name: Kenneth Henry Clements
- Date of birth: 9 April 1955 (age 71)
- Place of birth: Middleton, England
- Height: 6 ft 1 in (1.85 m)
- Position: Defender

Youth career
- Manchester City

Senior career*
Years	Team	Apps	(Gls)
1972–1979	Manchester City	119	(0)
1979–1985	Oldham Athletic	206	(2)
1985–1988	Manchester City	106	(1)
1988–1990	Bury	81	(1)
1990	Limerick	8	(0)
1990–1991	Shrewsbury Town	20	(0)
Total		540	(4)

Managerial career
- 1990: Limerick (player-manager)
- * Club domestic league appearances and goals

Kenneth Henry Clements (born 9 April 1955 in Middleton, Lancashire) is an English former footballer who played as a defender in the Football League for Manchester City, in two spells, between 1971 and 1979 and between 1985 and 1988, Oldham Athletic, Bury and Shrewsbury Town, and was briefly player-manager of League of Ireland club Limerick. He made 282 appearances for Manchester City in all competitions, scoring twice. He was an unused substitute when Manchester City won the 1976 Football League Cup Final.

Before beginning his playing career with Manchester City, Clements was an assistant groundsman at Maine Road. After retiring from football, Clements opened a driving school in the Oldham area, and resumed his interest in painting. He now works as a chauffeur for Manchester property tycoon Aneel Mussarat at MCR Property Ltd in Rusholme, Manchester, UK.
