= Paul Moulden =

English footballer

Personal information
- Full name: Paul Anthony Joseph Moulden
- Date of birth: 6 September 1967 (age 59)
- Place of birth: Farnworth, England
- Height: 5 ft 8 in (1.73 m)
- Position: Striker

Youth career
- Bolton Lads' Club

Senior career*
Years	Team	Apps	(Gls)
1984–1989	Manchester City	64	(18)
1989–1990	AFC Bournemouth	32	(13)
1990–1993	Oldham Athletic	38	(4)
1992	→ Molde (loan)	4	(0)
1992	→ Brighton & Hove Albion (loan)	11	(5)
1993–1995	Birmingham City	20	(5)
1995	Huddersfield Town	2	(1)
1995–1996	Rochdale	16	(1)
1996–199?	Accrington Stanley		
1997–1999	Bacup Borough		

International career
1983–1985	England U17	8	(5)
1984–1986	England Youth	10	(6)
1985	England U20	2	(0)
- * Club domestic league appearances and goals

Paul Anthony Joseph Moulden (born 6 September 1967) is an English former professional footballer who played as a striker for Manchester City, AFC Bournemouth, Oldham Athletic, Molde, Brighton & Hove Albion, Birmingham City, Huddersfield Town and Rochdale. He represented England at youth levels.

== Career ==
Moulden was born in Farnworth, near Bolton, Lancashire. and attended Thornleigh Salesian College in Bolton. As a youth he entered the Guinness Book of Records by scoring 340 goals in a single season for Bolton Lads Club under-15s. He subsequently joined Manchester City, where he was a part of the team which won the 1986 FA Youth Cup. He made his first team debut on 1 January 1986 against Aston Villa aged 18. He made only two further first team appearances that season, both as substitute, but finished the season as top scorer for the reserve team. His first extended run in the first team came in late 1986, and he scored his first goals for the club in a 3–1 win over Aston Villa on 8 November. A broken leg restricted him to three starts in the 1987–88 season. The following season Moulden started the majority of matches, finishing the season as top scorer with 13 goals in 36 league appearances as Manchester City gained promotion to the First Division. However, in the close season he was sold to AFC Bournemouth as a makeweight in the deal which took Ian Bishop to Maine Road.

Moulden spent just seven months on the south coast, scoring 13 goals in 37 starts for the Cherries, before moving to Oldham Athletic on transfer deadline day. At Oldham he struggled with injuries, starting 19 matches in three years. In 1992, Moulden had loan spells at Norwegian club Molde and Brighton & Hove Albion. He then had short spells with a succession of clubs, playing for Birmingham City, Huddersfield and Rochdale before dropping out of League football in 1996.

After retiring from full-time football, he opened a fish and chip shop and played non-league football for Accrington Stanley and Bacup Borough. He went on to coach juniors at his old boys' club and at Manchester City's academy.

== Personal life ==
His son Louie is also a footballer.

== Honours ==
Oldham Athletic

- Football League Second Division: 1990–91
