= Christianity and association football =

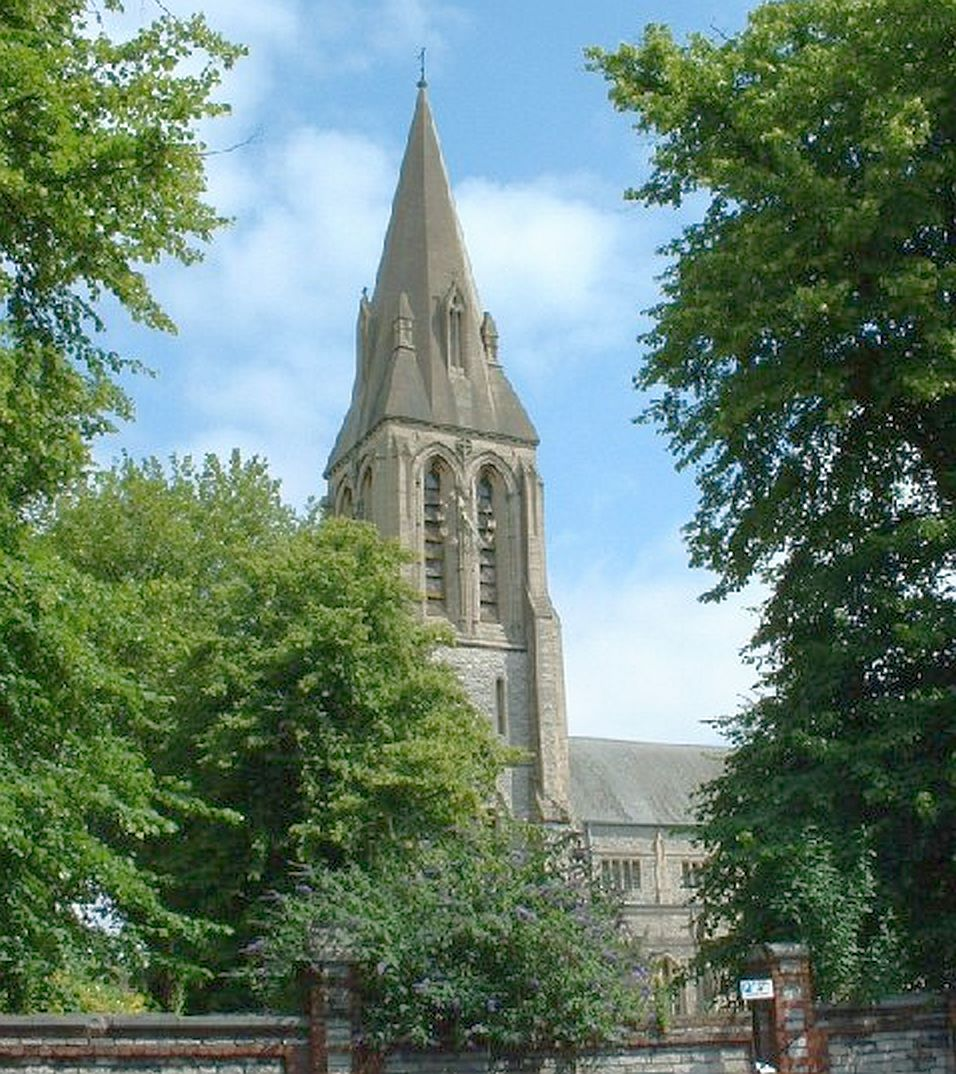
St. Mary's Church, Southampton established Southampton F.C. in 1885. The team, still known as "The Saints", play at St. Mary's Stadium.

There has been an extremely long history of the involvement of Christianity and association football. In 16th-century England, Puritan Christians opposed the contemporary forms of football, due to its violence and its practice on Sunday, the Sabbath day of rest. However, from the 19th century, Christians espousing the movement of "Muscular Christianity" encouraged the game for its physical and social benefits. Several of England's leading clubs, including Everton, Manchester City, Southampton and Aston Villa, were founded by churches, as was Celtic in Scotland. There have also been leagues set up specifically for Christian clubs outside of the normal national league pyramid.

Several footballers have pledged themselves to become Christian monks, preachers and clergymen in their retirement.

== History ==
=== 16th century ===
Puritan preachers Thomas Eliot and Philip Stubbs voiced their disdain for football because of the violence in matches at the time. Men were fined for playing the game on church grounds or on a Sunday.

=== 19th century ===
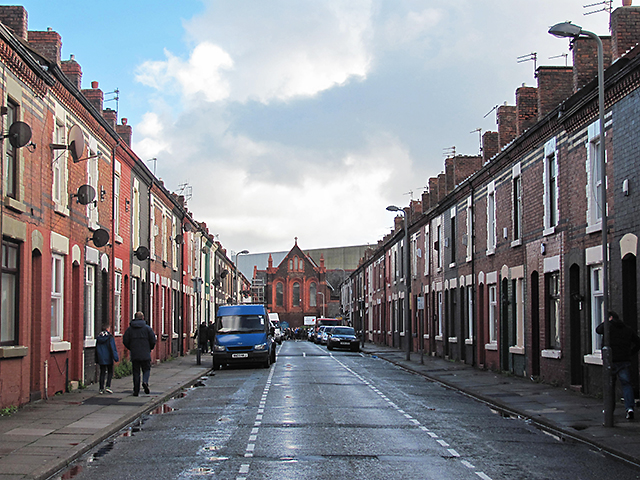
St Luke's Church at Goodison Park

Following the adoption of the Sheffield rules and formation of The Football Association in England, a number of football clubs were founded by churches. Everton Football Club were founded in 1879 at St. Domingo's Methodist Church. The Reverend Ben Chambers was an advocate of Muscular Christianity, encouraging healthy minds and healthy bodies. Their Goodison Park ground has a church partially within the perimeter and as such do not play early matches on Sunday to avoid clashing with the services of the church. In the same year, Fulham St Andrew's Church Sunday School F.C., to later become Fulham F.C., was founded by members of the nearby Church of England church for members of the Sunday school with the same focus as Everton of advocating Muscular Christianity. In November 1880, St. Mark's Anglican Church in West Gorton, inspired by the same ideology and to win young men back to the church, set up a football team which later became Manchester City F.C. St. Mary's Church, Southampton set up a team in 1885, which later became Southampton Football Club. On 6 November 1887, the Celtic Football Club was founded at the Catholic St. Mary's Church Hall in Calton as a way to fight poverty in East Glasgow. Their Glasgow neighbours Rangers F.C. later became associated with the Protestant section of Glasgow which led to the Old Firm rivalry, which has been the centre of several sectarian incidents between Scotland's Protestants and Catholics.

=== 20th century ===
London-based Arsenal F.C. moved to Arsenal Stadium in 1913 on ground leased from St John's College of Divinity. The lease conditions stated that there would be no matches played on holy days and no "intoxicating liquour" would be sold at the stadium. However, these stipulations were dropped after Arsenal bought the ground outright in 1925.

In Northern Ireland, Christianity plays a strong part of life in football. Until 2008, playing football was banned on Sunday, including the Northern Ireland national football team due to Sabbatarianism of the Protestant majority and also due to the Sunday Observance Act 1695. Belfast club Linfield F.C. currently maintains a ban on the club playing on Sundays.

== Players ==
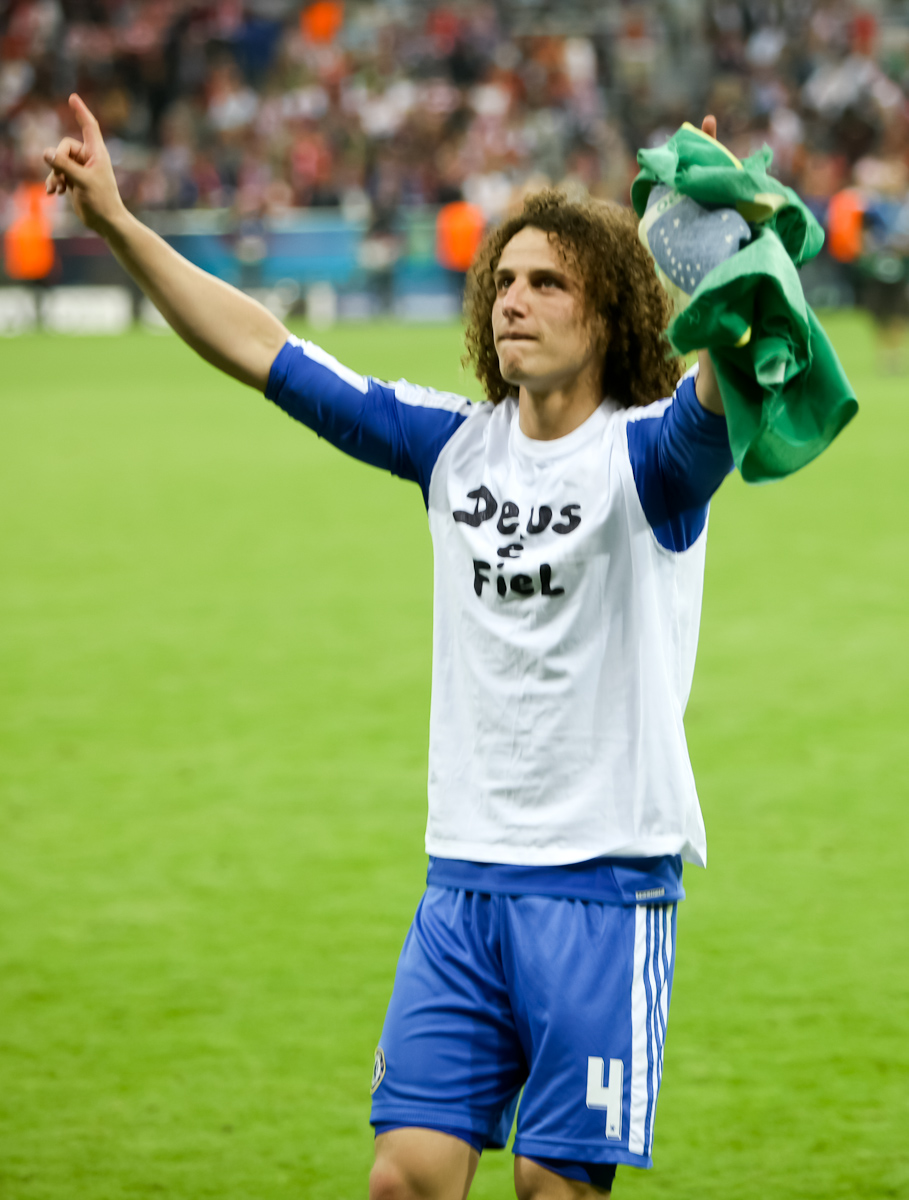
David Luiz, a Brazilian evangelical, wearing a t-shirt reading "Deus é fiel" (God is faithful) after Chelsea's victory in the 2012 UEFA Champions League Final.

Port Vale half-back Norman Hallam was a Methodist Minister, and conducted the funeral of his manager Gordon Hodgson, following his sudden death in June 1951. In 1970, Peter Knowles voluntarily left his career as a footballer with Wolverhampton Wanderers to follow the Christian denomination, Jehovah's Witnesses. In 1991 folk-rock musician Billy Bragg released a song, "God's Footballer", on his album Don't Try This at Home inspired by Knowles' story. Midfielder Gavin Peacock became a Christian during his first spell with QPR aged 18 and later left the UK to become a pastor in Calgary, Canada. Jermain Defoe has credited his Christian faith as helping him in his footballing career. George Moncur, like his father John are Christians, George being quoted as saying "As long as you give 100 per cent, you live right off the field and play right on it, then the Lord will take care of the rest". Goalkeeper Artur Boruc was nicknamed "The Holy Goalie" due to his Catholic faith which he openly displayed at matches by making the sign of the cross. Striker Mateja Kežman, a devout member of the Serbian Orthodox Church, pledged to become a monk in his retirement. Christianity is entwined with the culture of football in Brazil, and 2007 Ballon d'Or winner Kaká has pledged to spend his retirement preaching the faith.

Footballers adhering to Christianity have also affected their abilities to play on Sunday. During the 1982 FIFA World Cup, Northern Irish player and born-again Christian, Johnny Jameson refused to play for Northern Ireland against France due to the match being on a Sunday. Argentine goalkeeper Carlos Roa, who took retirement at the turn of the millennium believing that the world would end, would not play on Saturdays, the Sabbath of the Seventh-day Adventist Church.

Pope John Paul II played as a goalkeeper, and supported K.S. Cracovia during his youth in Poland.

== Clubs ==
Several football clubs in the present day have Christian names or nicknames often associated with them. Scottish football clubs St Johnstone F.C. and St Mirren F.C. are named after Saint John the Baptist and Saint Mirin respectively. Welsh team The New Saints F.C. were contemporarily named as such due to an association with Saint Oswald as well as being able to retain their TNS initials after their Total Network Solutions sponsorship name lapsed.

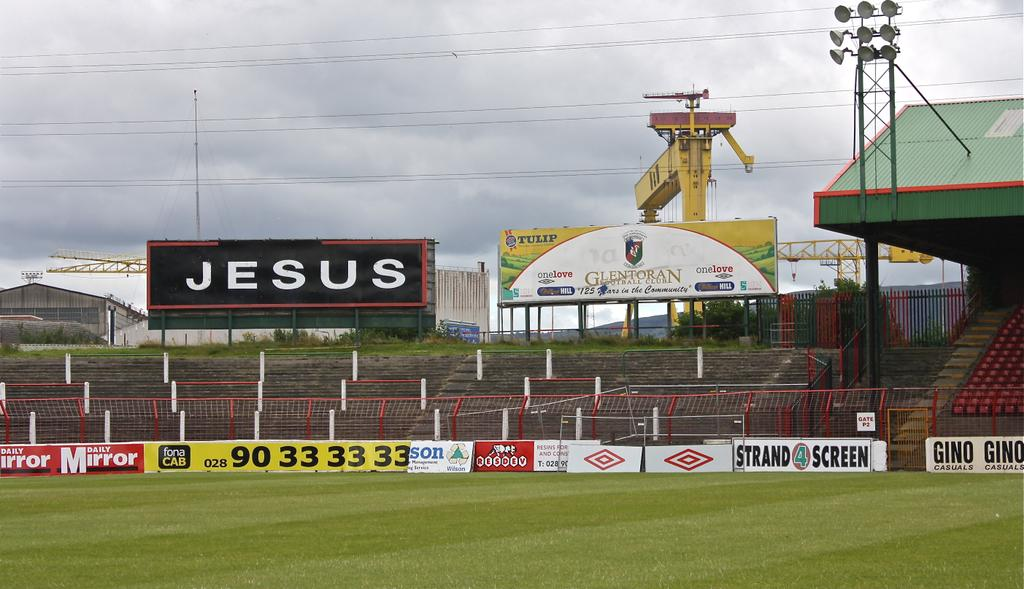
Glentoran's "Jesus" sign

Several clubs also have Christian messages publicly displayed at their grounds. Between 1995 and 2010, Northern Irish club Glentoran F.C. had a sign with "Jesus" on it at The Oval before it was removed due to Glentoran needing the space for advertising. Fellow Northern Irish club Portadown F.C. had a sign with "Life without Jesus makes no sense" along the side of Shamrock Park. Football clubs have also used their grounds for Christian services including Rangers using Ibrox Stadium for memorial services for the 1971 Ibrox disaster and likewise Liverpool F.C. using Anfield for annual memorial services for victims of the Hillsborough disaster.

Assyriska FF, founded in 1971 in the Swedish city of Södertälje and playing in the Superettan (second division), represents the Assyrians, a Christian ethnoreligious group native to the Middle East. Although often referred to as an "unofficial national team", membership is openly available to players of all origins.

== Music ==
Since the 1927 FA Cup Final between Arsenal and Cardiff City, the first and last verses of the Christian hymn, "Abide with Me" are traditionally sung at the FA Cup Final before the kick-off of the match, at around 2.45pm BST. Christian hymns have also formed a part of individual club cultures. Southampton's club anthem is "When the Saints Go Marching In" and West Bromwich Albion use "The Lord's My Shepherd". Rangers adopted the tune of the hymn "Follow On" as the tune of their Follow Follow anthem. Their fans also use "God Save the King" along with fans of the England national football team.

== See also ==
- Islam and association football
