= William Cushing (disambiguation) =

William Cushing may refer to:

- William Cushing (1732–1810), early associate justice of the United States Supreme Court
- William B. Cushing (1842–1874), United States Navy officer
- William Henry Cushing (1852–1934), Canadian politician
- William Orcutt Cushing (1823–1902), American hymn writer
