= Islam and association football =

Some association football players are Muslims, and their clubs have adapted to their principles. In addition, association football is generally the most popular sport in the Arab world.

In July 2013, BBC journalist Rob Cowling remarked that Muslim players were changing the culture of English football. The Islamic observance of Ramadan, affects the ability of players to train and play, while some players have refused to wear football shirts sponsored by gambling and finance companies, as gambling and charging interest are prohibited in Islam.

Some Muslim players have been subjected to racist abuse in the sport, and clubs which sign Muslim players have also been targeted.

== Popularity and conflict ==
Football was introduced to Iran by British oil workers and promoted under the regime of Reza Shah in the 1920s. Although both playing and watching the game have often been in conflict with religious requirements under the Islamic Republic of Iran, it continues to be popular.

In 2011, a women's football team called Girls FC, made-up of both Muslims and Christians, was formed. Despite religious requirements and objections at the women wearing shorts and "playing a man's game", the team proved to be popular.

== Ramadan ==
In 2010, Iranian player Ali Karimi was sacked by his Tehran-based club Steel Azin for breaking the fast during Ramadan. Karimi was seen drinking water during a training session; he denied any insult and was reinstated by the club after agreeing to pay a $40,000 fine. In 2011, the debilitating effect on the fitness of players was noted in connection with Newcastle United player Demba Ba. Described as "drained and lethargic" due to fasting during Ramadan, he scored three goals in just over thirty minutes in a 3–1 win against Blackburn Rovers in his first match after Ramadan.

Football players performing at the highest level still conform to fasting despite higher risks of injuries. During Ramadan in 2019, AFC Ajax players Hakim Ziyech and Noussair Mazroui entered the 2nd leg of UEFA Champions League Semi Final against Tottenham Hotspurs while fasting, only to break it 24 minutes into the match after the sun was fully set. The duo was captured drinking power gel and water on the pitch.

In the 2018 FIFA World Cup, Mouez Hassan, the Tunisian goalkeeper took advantage of the FIFA rule that mandates the game to be paused when the goalkeeper gets injured. During the games against Portugal and Turkey, Hassan tactically collapsed immediately after sunset in order to give his teammates a chance to break their fast, who feasted on dates and ion drinks. The strategy turned out to be successful, as Tunisia managed to tie 2–2 in both games, against higher FIFA ranked teams.

Not all Islam-based countries conformed to fasting in the World Cup. The majority of Saudi Arabian players, who were to play Russia in the opening fixture, opted to postpone their religious commitment until after the tournament, understanding the hardships they faced such as experiencing 18 hours of daylight in Russia. They were given authorization by the Saudi authorities, who issued abstention permits.

In April 2021, Leicester City player Wesley Fofana broke his fast on the pitch during a Premier League match.

Major League Soccer introduced a "sustenance break" in the 2023 season specifically for iftar. The break was indicated by the referee as a stoppage in play after sundown and treated as a hydration break.

In March 2025, during Ramadan, Dango Ouattara said that his faith came before football.

== Prayer ==
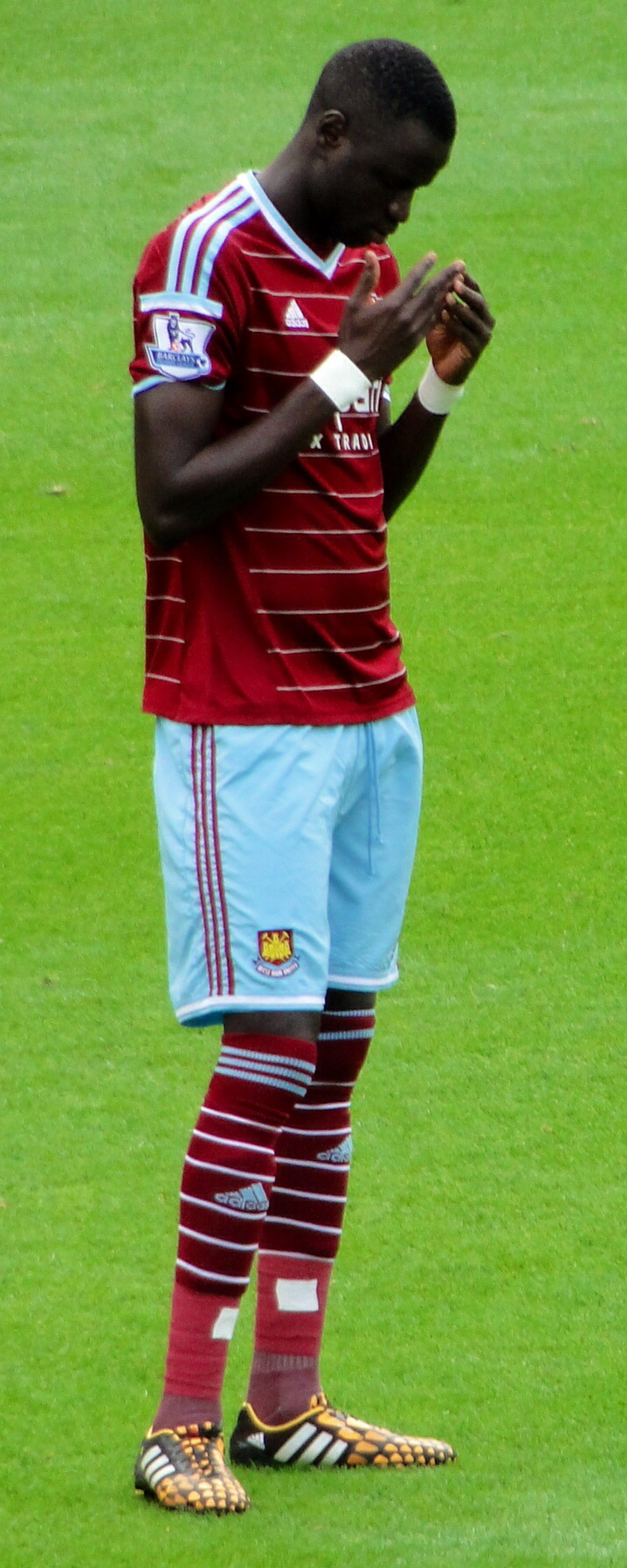
Cheikhou Kouyaté makes dua before a game

Observance of their Islamic prayers has brought players into conflict with their managers. Harry Redknapp, when manager of West Ham United, was critical of player Frédéric Kanouté's prayer and fasting requirements. Newcastle United considered the introduction of prayer rooms at both St James' Park and at their training ground. Whilst not designed exclusively for Muslims, the rooms were planned to be used for prayer by Muslim players Demba Ba, Papiss Cissé, Hatem Ben Arfa and Cheik Tioté. The club pointed out that this is in marked contrast to the experiences of their former player and convert to Islam, Didier Domi, who was mocked when discovered doing Islamic prayers in the showers. By the 2012-13 season, Newcastle's seven Muslim players regularly used a purpose built multi-faith training ground prayer room.

Several players, such as Demba Ba and Papiss Cissé, choose an act of prostration with forehead to the ground as a celebration after scoring a goal. In 2012, football commentator Gary Lineker was forced to apologise after describing one such celebration by player Karim Ait-Fana for French side Montpellier against Schalke in the Champions League as "eating grass". Muslim footballers have also worn T-shirts carrying messages relating to Islam under their football shirts. Queens Park Rangers player Adel Taarabt has worn a shirt carrying the message "I Love Allah" whilst Samir Nasri, in 2012, celebrated a goal for Manchester City against Southampton with a shirt carrying the message "Eid Mubarak".

In October 2016, fans attending a World Cup qualifying game between Iran and South Korea at the Azadi Stadium in Tehran were asked to replace usual football chanting with religious chants as the match fell on a day of commemoration for Tasu'a, a Shia Islam holy day.

Following the increase in its Muslim fan base, the English Premier League clubs are implementing prayer rooms in their stadiums. Newly promoted Aston Villa is one of the clubs that provides prayer facilities not only to its players, but also to its fans and employees. Other British clubs including Newcastle United, Swansea City, Sunderland, Bournemouth, Norwich City and Watford are also willing to accommodate match-day prayer accommodations. Tottenham Hotspur, who completed their new stadium construction in 2019, have implemented multi-faith prayer rooms. In May 2022, Blackburn Rovers became the first club in the United Kingdom to host Eid prayers with 2000 people celebrating the end of the holy month of Ramadan on the pitch.

== Islam and English football ==
The Premier League, England's top-tier football league, was officially founded in February 1992. During the league's inaugural 1992–93 season, only one Spanish player Nayim, practiced Islam.

However, as of the 2018–19 season there were more than 50 Muslims playing in the Premier League and 19 out of the 20 teams had at least one Muslim player. These include a number of prominent players including Liverpool's Mohamed Salah and Sadio Mané, Manchester United's Paul Pogba, Arsenal's Mesut Özil, Chelsea's N'Golo Kanté and Kurt Zouma, and Manchester City's Riyad Mahrez.

The growing number of Muslim players has been fueled by the internationalization of football. That has also led to greater understanding and willingness on the part of Premier League clubs and fans to accommodate players' religious needs. The league now employs a Muslim chaplain and some clubs have dedicated prayer rooms.

Whilst Islamophobia in the Premier League still exists, the presence of Muslim football stars in the Premier League may be having a positive effect on Islamophobia across English society according to a Stanford University study which linked an 18.9% drop in anti-Muslim hate crimes in the county where Liverpool is located since Salah joined the team.

In June 2021, it was announced that Premier League clubs would enter into a code for balancing sponsorship deals with the beliefs of Muslim players. In March 2023, three Football League clubs (Millwall, Luton and Swansea) also signed it.

In March 2022, it was announced that during the forthcoming Ramadan, players would be entitled to have a 'drinks break' to break their fast. Later that month, Everton footballer Abdoulaye Doucoure spoke about the upcoming Ramadan period as a player. The break was repeated in April 2023, and February 2026.

As of April 2023, Bradford City's women's team had Muslim coaches.

In September 2025, Djed Spence became the first Muslim player to be called-up by England. On 9 September 2025, Spence made his debut for the English senior squad in a 5-0 victory against Serbia in the 2026 FIFA World Cup qualifiers, replacing Reece James in the 69th minute. In doing so he became the first Muslim player for England.

During a break in play for Ramadan in March 2026, Leeds fans booed Manchester City's Muslim players. The Leeds management condemned the fans.

== Kits and sponsorship ==
Muslim leaders in Malaysia have called for Muslims not to wear football shirts with crosses on the badge, such as FC Barcelona and Brazil, seeing them as prioritising Christianity. They have also warned against Manchester United shirts, which feature a devil.

In 2012, Real Madrid removed a cross from their club crest on promotional material. The change was linked with the building of a $1 billion sports tourist resort in the Islamic United Arab Emirates.

Frédéric Kanouté used to modify his Sevilla shirt, to obscure the sponsorship from online casino 888.com. The club later came to an agreement that the player was not endorsing gambling by wearing it, and would be excused from any promotional material with 888.

In July 2013, Newcastle United player Papiss Cissé refused to play in a shirt sponsored by Wonga.com, a payday loan company, as the charging of interest is not permitted under Islamic law. Soon after, he agreed to wear the shirt after being photographed in a casino.

== Dress code ==
The requirements of Islamic dress code have been contradictory to the kit requirements of FIFA. In 2011, the Iran women's football team was prevented from playing a game in a qualifying round for the 2012 Olympic Games due to their kit which comprised full tracksuits and head coverings concealing their hair. Women in Iran are required to wear the maghnaeh to cover their heads. FIFA ruled that the kit broke one of their rules which states, "Players and officials shall not display political, religious, commercial or personal messages or slogans in any language or form on their playing or team kits." Although the Iranian footballing federation argued that the kit was neither religious nor political, Iran were prevented from playing the game which was awarded, 3–0 to Jordan. By 2012, FIFA had changed their ruling declaring that women were free to wear the hijab at senior competitive level.

In July 2023, a campaign was launched in England to allow schoolgirls to wear hijabs whilst playing football. Later that month, Moroccan player Nouhaila Benzina became the first player to wear a hijab at a World Cup.

In October 2024, women's footballer, Iqra Ismail was prevented from playing in tracksuit bottoms rather than shorts, which she believed compromised her religious beliefs. Representing Regent's Park grassroots team, United Dragons FC, she was prevented by the referee from taking the field as she was told the wearing of shorts was a requirement.

== Abuse ==
There have been numerous cases of anti-Muslim abuse aimed at Muslim footballers. In 2005, Egyptian footballer Mido whilst playing for Tottenham Hotspur was taunted by fans of West Ham United with "Your mum's a terrorist" and as a shoe bomber due to his likeness to Richard Reid. In 2007, Mido, then playing for Middlesbrough was taunted by Newcastle United fans with anti-Muslim abuse.

In October 2013, Muslim supporters of West Ham United were verbally abused whilst conducting Maghrib prayer in the Boleyn Ground during a Premier League game between West Ham and Manchester City. In March 2015, Muslim supporters of Liverpool were criticised and abused on social media after they had used the half-time interval to pray on prayer mats in a stairwell at Anfield during a match between Liverpool and Blackburn Rovers. Liverpool FC reacted immediately towards the abusive Tweet to the Merseyside Police and released an apology statement.

Israeli club Beitar Jerusalem had their offices burned by Jewish nationalists in January 2013 after signing their first Muslim players.

However, the attitude towards Muslim players are showing movement of change. The Premier league halted its tradition of giving champagne as a man-of-the-match award and altered it to a trophy when Muslim Manchester City star Yaya Touré began winning it on a regular basis.

According to researchers at Stanford University, Liverpool FC and Egyptian player Mohamed Salah played an influential role in reducing Islamophobia in the region. Since his arrival, Merseyside county witnessed a 18.9% drop in anti-Islam crimes and significantly decreased anti-Muslim tweets (7.8% to 3.8%) in comparison to fans of other top-tier English clubs thanks to increase in familiarity with Islam.

In February 2019, both West Ham United and the police investigated Islamophobic abuse towards Mohamed Salah emanating from the home supporters at the London Stadium during a game between West Ham and Liverpool. Video footage was obtained where someone can be heard shouting "Salah, you fucking Muslim, fucking Muslim cunt" at Salah. In October 2020, a West Ham United supporter was convicted of committing a racially-aggravated public order offence. He was fined £400 and banned from football games for three years.

== In film ==
The 2006 film Offside deals with the subject of football, in this case in Iran, and female spectators. A ban made during the 1979 Iranian Revolution which stopped women from attending games, with Islamic religious leaders stating that women in stadiums was a recipe for disaster as they would see "bare legs" and hear profanities shouted by male fans. President Mahmoud Ahmadinejad had tried to end the ban before his attempts were vetoed by the country's supreme leader, Ayatollah Ali Khamenei. The film tells the stories of girls disguising themselves as males in order to watch a 2006 FIFA World Cup qualification match between Iran and Bahrain at the Azadi Stadium in Tehran. It was banned from screening in Iran.

== See also ==
- Christianity and association football
- Football at the Islamic Solidarity Games
