= Under His Wings (Manders) =

Gospel song composed by Stephen Manders

Under His Wings is a soulful gospel song composed by Stephen Manders, and inspired by the 19th century hymn of William Orcutt Cushing and music of Ira D. Sankey.

== Background ==
During the late 19th century, Cushing wrote the hymn titled, "Under His Wings." The words of this hymn reflected Cushing's personal suffering, and was inspired by Psalm 17:8, which states “keep me as the apple of Your eye; hide me under the shadow of your wings.” Ira Sankey eventually added a tune to this piece.

=== Cushings' Original Lyrics ===
Under His wings I am safely abiding,

Though the night deepens and tempests are wild,
Still I can trust Him; I know He will keep me,
He has redeemed me, and I am His child.

Refrain

Under His wings, under His wings,
Who from His love can sever?
Under His wings my soul shall abide,
Safely abide forever.
Under His wings, what a refuge in sorrow!
How the heart yearningly turns to His rest!
Often when earth has no balm for my healing,
There I find comfort, and there I am blessed.

Refrain

Under His wings, oh, what precious enjoyment!
There will I hide till life’s trials are o'er;
Sheltered, protected, no evil can harm me,
Resting in Jesus, I’m safe evermore.

Refrain

Stephen Manders adapted the music and words of Cushing's original hymn in his composition of the gospel piece. According to the music score, Manders' piece starts off slow and sweet, as the sopranos sing of the peace found under the wings of the Lord. The legato voices create an aura of trust and refuge. The light tone featured at the beginning of the song transitions to an energetic, bold tone as the choir sings that they "will not fear." The piece returns to the sweet harmony featured at the beginning of the piece, inspiring happiness and contentment, as the choir sings about how the Lord will hide us under his wings.

=== Manders' Lyrics ===
Under his wings, there my soul finds peace.
Even through the storm, I can trust him;
He redeemeth me.
Whom from thy love can sever?
I find my strength in thee.
Safely abide forever under his wings.
I shall not fear. I'm in the shadow of his wings,
and I shall dwell in the house of the Lord forever.
I will sing: He is my fortress, my Redeemer.
I will worship Christ the King, and he shall hide me under his wings.
Under his wings, my soul shall abide,
Safely abide forever.
