= Western physical culture =

Western-origin physical culture

Western physical culture is the form of physical culture that originated mainly in the West.

== History ==
=== Ancient era ===
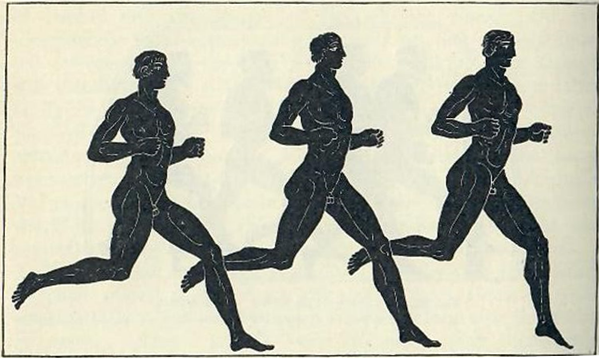
An ancient Greek depiction of long-distance running.

The practice of calisthenics by the ancient Greeks, as well as the way in which sport was a major part of their society, as seen in events such as the Ancient Olympic Games and the way in which sport featured in domains such as poetry and religion, served as a foundation for modern Western physical culture.

Many current rural games in the West are believed to have originated as pagan practices from around the time of the ancient Greeks onward.

=== Medieval era ===
The ancient Olympics came to an end around the late 5th century CE partially due to changing cultural tastes that were influenced by the uptake of Christianity throughout Europe, though broader claims that are often made of Christianity having been wholly responsible for the end of the ancient Olympics have been debunked. Christians continued to practice sports during feast days, holy days and Sundays throughout the medieval era. However, gymnasium cultures declined in Europe up until the Renaissance, though the utilitarian war-oriented tradition of ancient Spartan and Roman training methods, which contrasted with the broader humanistic educational background that most ancient Greek physical cultural forms were offered in, remained relevant.

=== Modern era ===
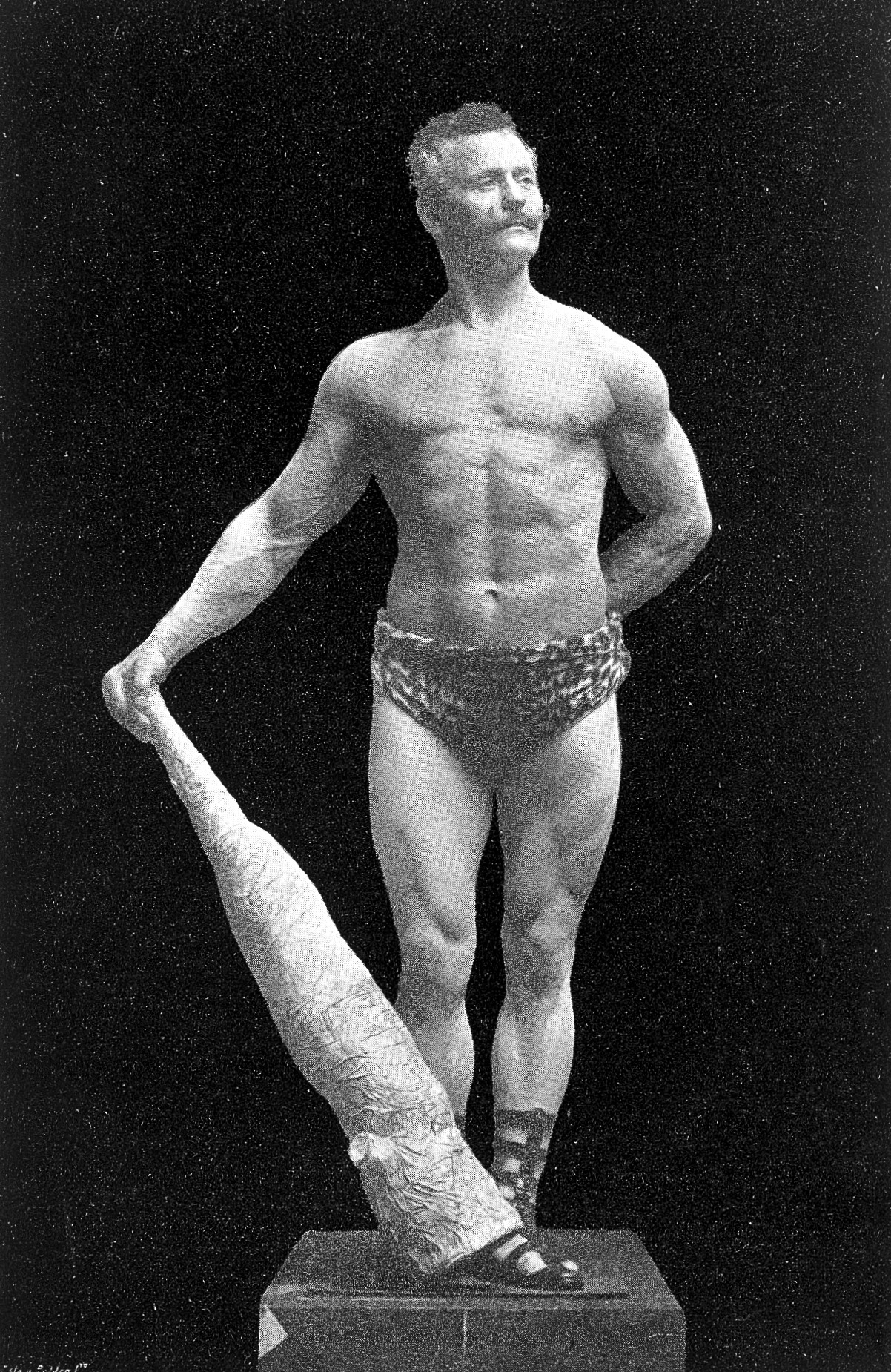
Eugen Sandow, a global icon of bodybuilding around the turn of the 20th century.

The physical culture movement in the United States during the 19th century owed its origins to several cultural trends.

In the United States, German immigrants after 1848 introduced a physical culture system based on gymnastics that became popular, especially in colleges. Many local Turner clubs introduced physical education (PE) in the form of 'German gymnastics' into American colleges and public schools. The perception of Turner as 'non-American' prevented the 'German system' from becoming the dominating form. They were especially important mainly in the cities with a large German-American population, but their influence slowly spread.

By the late 19th century reformers worried that sedentary white-collar workers were suffering from various "diseases of affluence" that were partially attributed to their increasingly sedentary lifestyles. In consequence, numerous exercise systems were developed, typically drawing from a range of traditional folk games, dances and sports, military training, and medical calisthenics.

Physical culture programs were promoted through the education system, particularly at military academies, as well as via public and private gymnasiums.

The industry began the production of various items of exercise-oriented sports equipment. During the early and mid-19th century, these printed works and items of apparatus generally addressed exercise as a form of remedial physical therapy.

Certain items of equipment and types of exercise were common to several different physical culture systems, including exercises with Indian clubs, medicine balls, wooden or iron wands, and dumbbells.

Combat sports such as fencing, boxing, savate and wrestling were also widely practiced in physical culture schools and were touted as forms of physical culture in their own right.

The Muscular Christianity movement of the late 19th century advocated a fusion of energetic Christian activism and rigorous physical culture training.

== Relationship with various movements ==
=== Christianity ===
Western physical culture experienced some suppression in the late medieval era as a result of Puritan sentiments. In early-19th century Britain, churches generally condemned sports as encouraging excessive violence and being associated with gambling. Throughout the West, the majority of church-goers were women, with the feminine non- or anti-body qualities of Christianity having been more influential on society than masculine/physical qualities for centuries. Western physical culture then received significant support due to the rise of Muscular Christianity. However, the British practice of playing sports at church greatly declined in the aftermath of World War II.

=== Militarism and imperialism ===
The battle of Waterloo was won on the playing fields of Eton.

— Duke of Wellington,

In imperial Britain, the push for physical fitness coincided with the overall military needs of the British Empire, with this push increasing as threats to the Empire emerged during its later period. The push for physical fitness also acted to suggest that greater moral character could be found in physical fitness, and that white men had a racial purity and thus an obligation to be involved in empire.

Throughout the early and middle 20th century, a greater usage of machinery in warfare made battlefields devoid of clumped-up masses of soldiers, which made individual soldiers more important, and increased the odds that soldiers had to brave in order to successfully kill enemies; in addition, industrialization, as well as a number of uniquely American factors, such as the closing of the frontier and corresponding urbanization, was seen as making men weak and "overcivilized". In order to provide the moral, psychological and other types of strengthening that were seen as necessary in these circumstances, physical training was further emphasized in American military training of the time.

=== Muscular religious nationalism ===
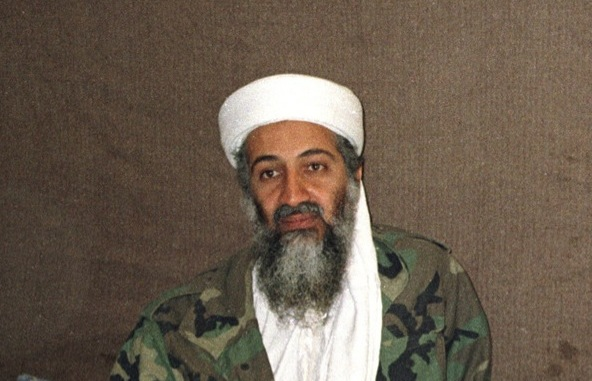
Osama bin Laden, who favored Muslims reclaiming masculinity allegedly lost in the colonial era by destroying American symbols of power.

During the colonial era, Western ideas around masculinity, as well as the way in which accusations of effeminateness against Western colonial subjects were employed, encouraged the growth of muscular religious movements throughout the world. With Muscular Christianity being a driving force behind Western physical culture and acting as a model for colonized peoples, movements such as Muscular Hinduism began in South Asia, though figures such as Gandhi sought to counteract this by demonstrating strength and generosity without muscularity. Some Jews, who had historically experienced millennia of discrimination within Europe, began to covet a kind of Muscular Judaism as a way to shake off what was argued by some to be the weakness of being in perpetual diaspora away from Israel. Islam, whose adherents had been treated as overtly "feminine" during the colonial era, came to host fundamentalism and terrorist movements that attempted to pit the masculinities of Westerners and Muslims against each other during the post-colonial era. Pankaj Mishra has argued that the ethnic cleansing in Myanmar can be in some sense tied back to Anagarika Dharmapala and the creation of a new 'muscular Buddhism'.

=== Nation-building and international community ===
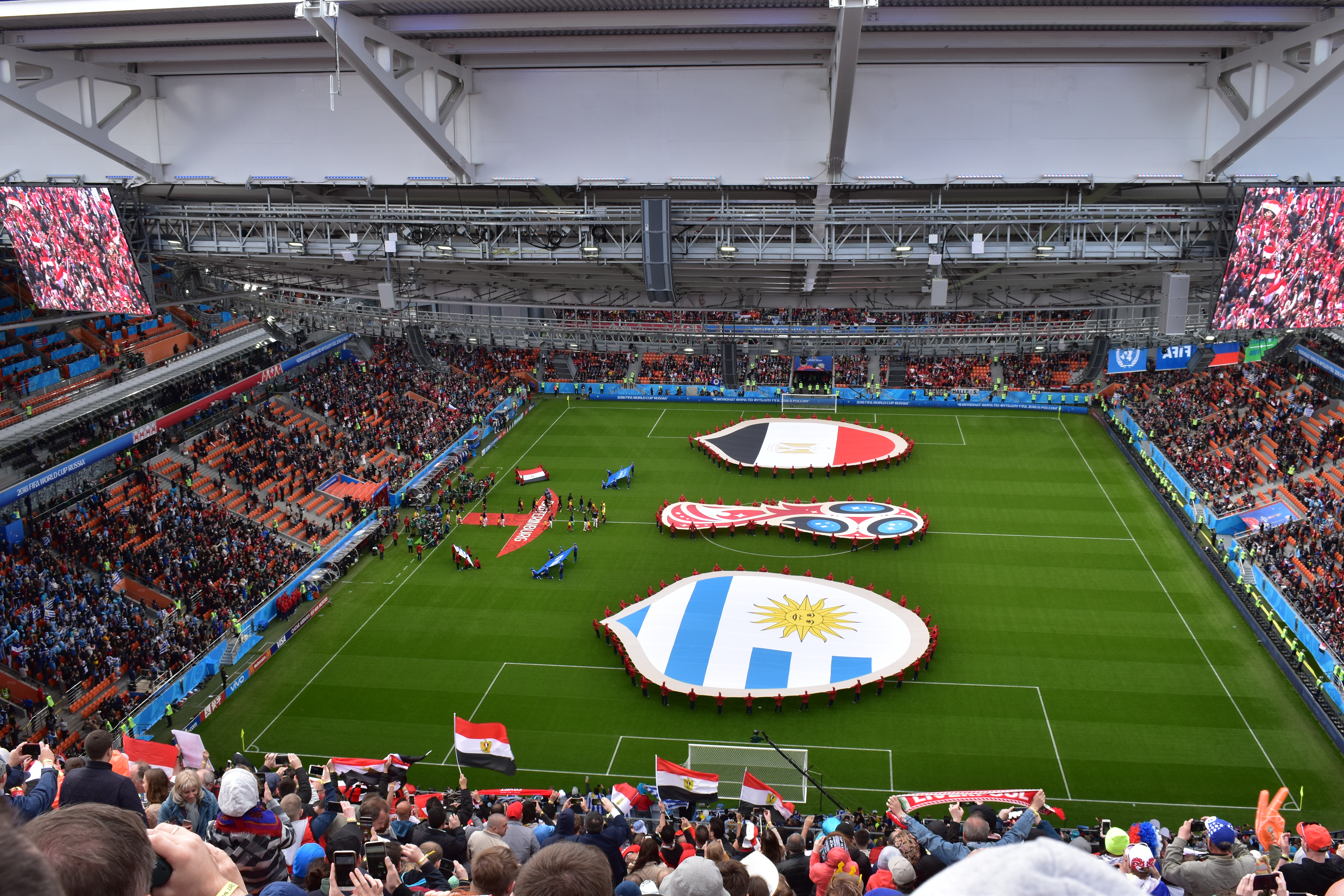
The flags of Egypt and Uruguay present on the pitch before the start of a FIFA World Cup match. The FIFA World Cup has been a major impetus for international relations.

The spread of Western sports around the world, as well as the Western origins of international sporting ties, as seen through the history of events such as the Olympics, have helped in the formation of the modern community of nations. The Commonwealth Games contributes to this aspect while building off of the way in which the legacy of Western imperialism brought various peoples together.

Developing countries have often encouraged greater participation in Western sports in part to have greater relevance on the world stage. Western sports have also served as part of the post-colonial nation-building process in many non-Western countries.

=== Straight white male supremacy ===
Western physical culture sometimes intertwined with broader gender-, sexuality- and race-related conflicts, such as eugenics, in Western countries. Homosexual people were seen as to be reviled during the peak of European imperialism, at a time when there was a dispersal of messaging about the need to reclaim masculinity through muscularity and the execution of a "regenerative violence" throughout the world. Women who succeeded in sports were often seen as less womanly, as fitting into a paradigm that centered around masculinity in sports.

Within the United States, Western physical culture supplanted Native American ideas about physical culture, with Native American women in particular being historically seen as bound to be physically weak without white intervention. In Canada, indigenous peoples sometimes used equestrian activities like rodeo to showcase their athletic prowess in relation to European settlers.

== Influence on the world ==
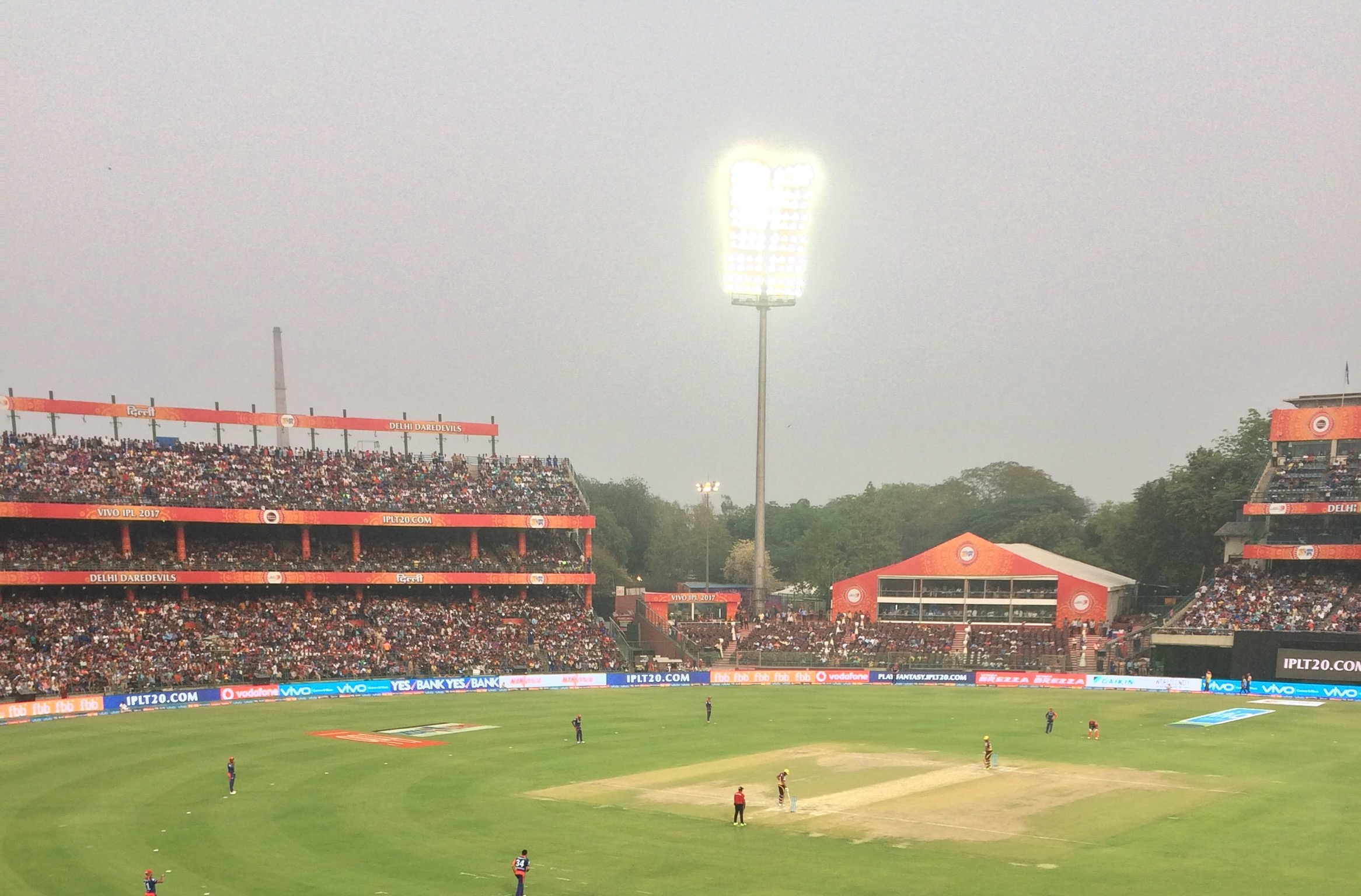
The Indian Premier League, one of the biggest sports league in the world, and the biggest league for T20 cricket, which is the most popular British-origin sport in South Asia.

Western physical culture greatly influenced the world during and after the colonial era. The practice of colonialism itself was underpinned by Western ideas regarding masculine fitness or absence thereof throughout the world; European colonizers often perceived that indigenous peoples were physically unfit and therefore incapable of governing themselves.

=== Africa ===
The colonization of Africa resulted in a deep marginalization of traditional African games, with Western physical culture having been imposed to a significant extent. One reason for this was the imperial desire to stamp out militaristic training activities that had been prevalent among the native population. Christian missionaries disseminated Western physical culture throughout Africa through the schooling systems, with the general belief that Western civilization should supplant the native culture because it was superior and more rational being a driving force; local games were seen as primitive and immoral.

African subjects were seen as having a natural strength greater than white men, but at the same time, white men's supposed superior physical discipline was used as a way of explaining Western dominance over Africa. In South Africa, Western sports were simultaneously included within the purview of apartheid policies and a vector of demonstration for anti-apartheid sentiments and performances.

=== Asia ===
Various Eastern martial arts which were earlier practiced as part of broader moral-philosophical systems became more akin to sporting/competitive activities with the advent of Western influences.

==== East Asia ====
===== China =====
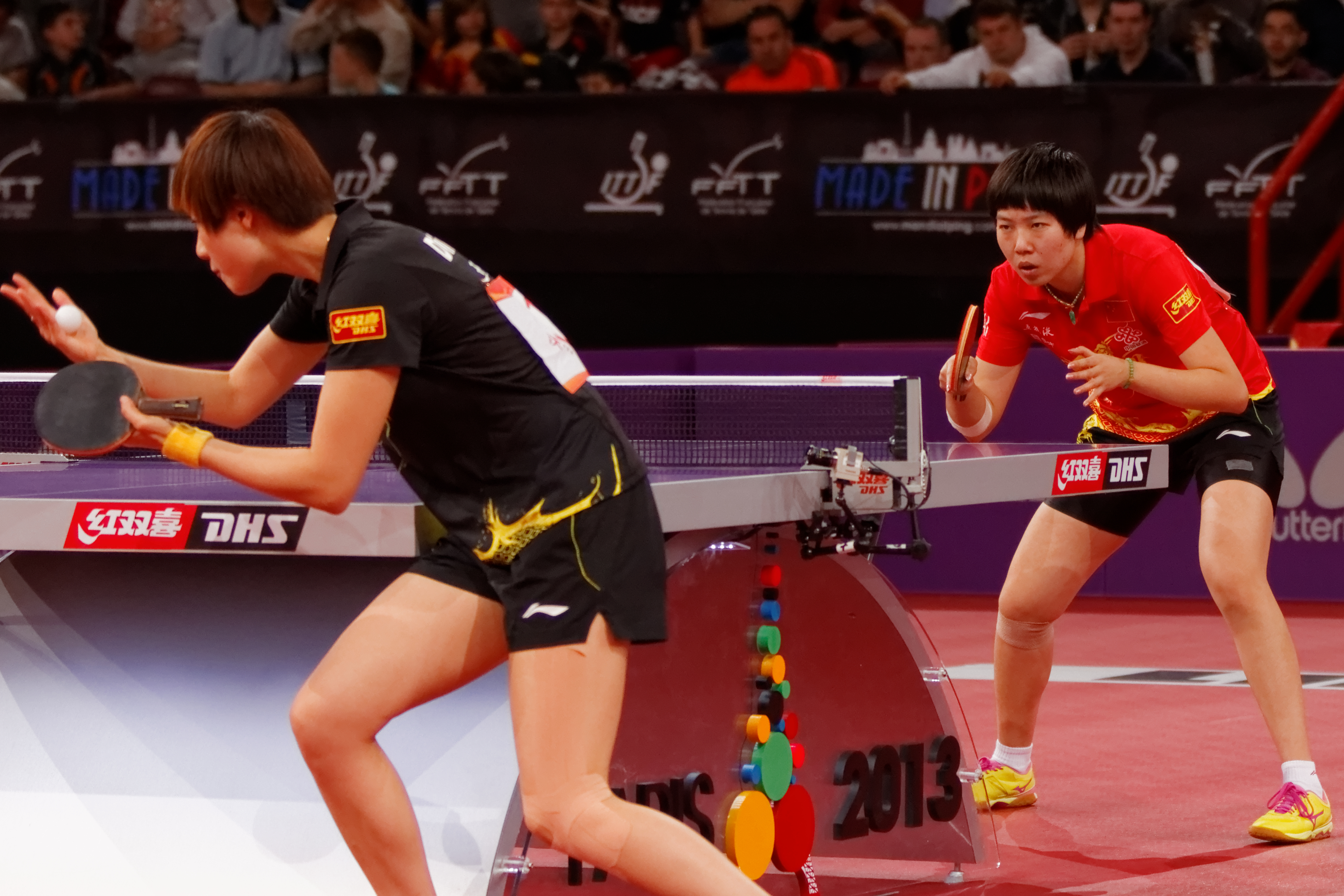
Professional Chinese athletes playing table tennis, a popular import from the West.

Western physical culture was brought into China with an initial element of Western military force backing its entry into Chinese society, and was introduced during the 19th-century Qing dynasty in the form of military drills, Western-style schooling, and Christian missionary influences by organizations such as the YMCA. The shock from the encounter with the West forced Chinese academics to debate the way in which the Western ideas surrounding physical culture should be adopted into Chinese society, with some calling for the end of "moribund" Chinese traditions.

Western physical culture contrasted with and overtook native Chinese physical culture to a significant extent, with Western physical culture encouraging a greater level of competitiveness, whereas Chinese physical culture, influenced by anti-physical Confucian ideals, emphasized internal cultivation of qi and the harmonious relationship between man and nature. However, traditional Chinese physical culture can be said to have preceded the West in the particular sense that a kind of 'muscular Buddhism', as seen with the Shaolin monks, had existed over a millennium before the British had championed muscular Christianity. In any case, the introduction of the competitiveness and ideas of "fair play" present in the Western physical culture into China is argued to have served as a foundation for modern global capitalism in the country, as well as a transition enforced by the Chinese government to a more militaristic/nationalistic Chinese nation-state, with sporting excellence in events such as the Olympics pursued as an ideal to unify China and present its rise on the world stage.

===== Japan =====
Western physical culture's introduction into Japan occurred in a relatively haphazard way, with a variety of Western professors, military personnel, and others teaching various sports to the Japanese.

==== South Asia ====
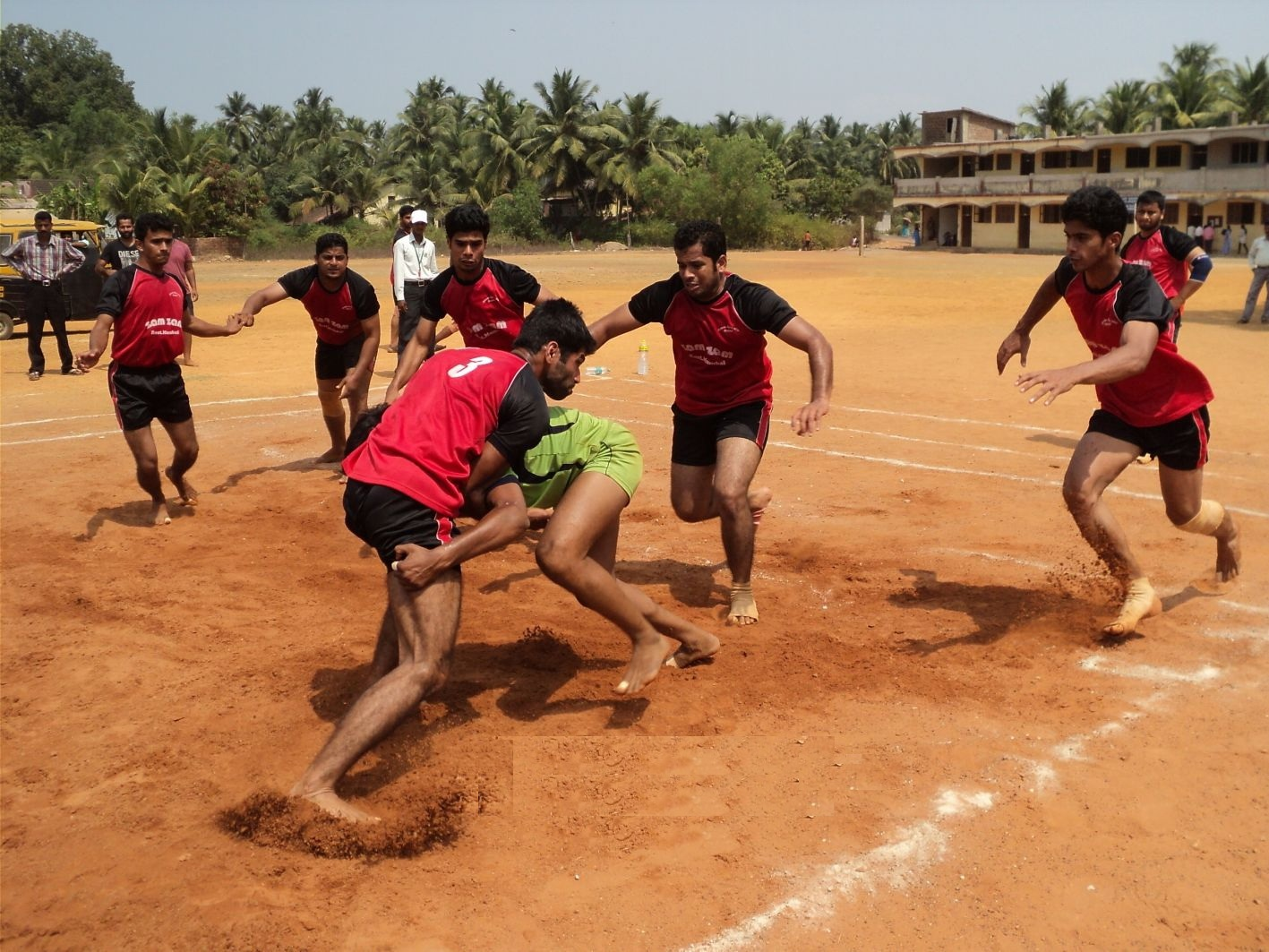
A player being tackled while playing kabaddi, the most popular traditional game in South Asia. It was first standardized due to British colonial influence.

Modern yoga originated from the colonial-era interaction between Western physical culture and pre-existing forms of hatha yoga in India, and grew as South Asians sought to combat British perceptions of Indian men as effeminate by fusing Western bodybuilding methodologies with indigenous traditions. The formation and propagation of modern yoga has led to what some have argued as being the neglect of the non-bodily aspects of yoga.

The YMCA was influential in introducing American ideas and certain standardizing influences into South Asian sports through the provincial governments. The overall colonial-era interaction between India and the West also led to the growth of movements such as Muscular Hinduism. Some South Asians played British sports as a form of anti-colonial resistance, by aiming to defeat their colonizers in these sports (with cricket in particular having continued in this role of creating a national platform for international competition in the post-colonial era.) British sports also served in some contexts as a way to break down caste barriers among South Asians.

==== Southeast Asia ====
In Laos, Western ideas around sport were introduced by applying Buddhist cultural conventions surrounding discipline and merit to physical fitness.

== Influences from the non-West ==
Eastern martial arts have grown in the West, and are often considered as having sacred or spiritual implications beyond that of traditional Western physical culture.

== See also ==
- Indian physical culture
