= Muscular Hinduism =

Philosophy promoting Hindu physical fitness

Muscular Hinduism is a philosophy that advocates for Hindus to be physically strong. Bankim Chandra Chatterjee and Swami Vivekananda are considered to have been major early proponents in the 19th and early 20th century.

== History ==
=== Colonial era ===
The muscularisation of Hinduism in Uttar Pradesh began to occur in the early 20th century, when communal conflicts expanded and urban Hindus became more visible in performing armed displays as part of processions during their religious festivals.

The Gita Press, which has links to the Rashtriya Swayamsevak Sangh (RSS), a Hindutva paramilitary organisation, is one of the oldest publishers that has supported Muscular Hinduism since the early 20th century.

Muscular Hinduism has been partly inspired by fears of violence by Muslims towards Hindus, particularly towards Hindu women. Muscular Hinduism was also inspired to an extent by Western influences such as Muscular Christianity on British ideas of religion, sport, and masculinity emerging in the 19th century. which were propounded in South Asia during British rule. Some influences in this direction also having come from the YMCA. Opposition to colonialism in general, and British stereotyping of Indian men as effeminate was also used as a rationale for Muscular Hinduism; Mahatma Gandhi propounded Muscular Hinduism as a counter to muscularity as propounded by the British during his early life as a way of addressing his feelings of physical inferiority.

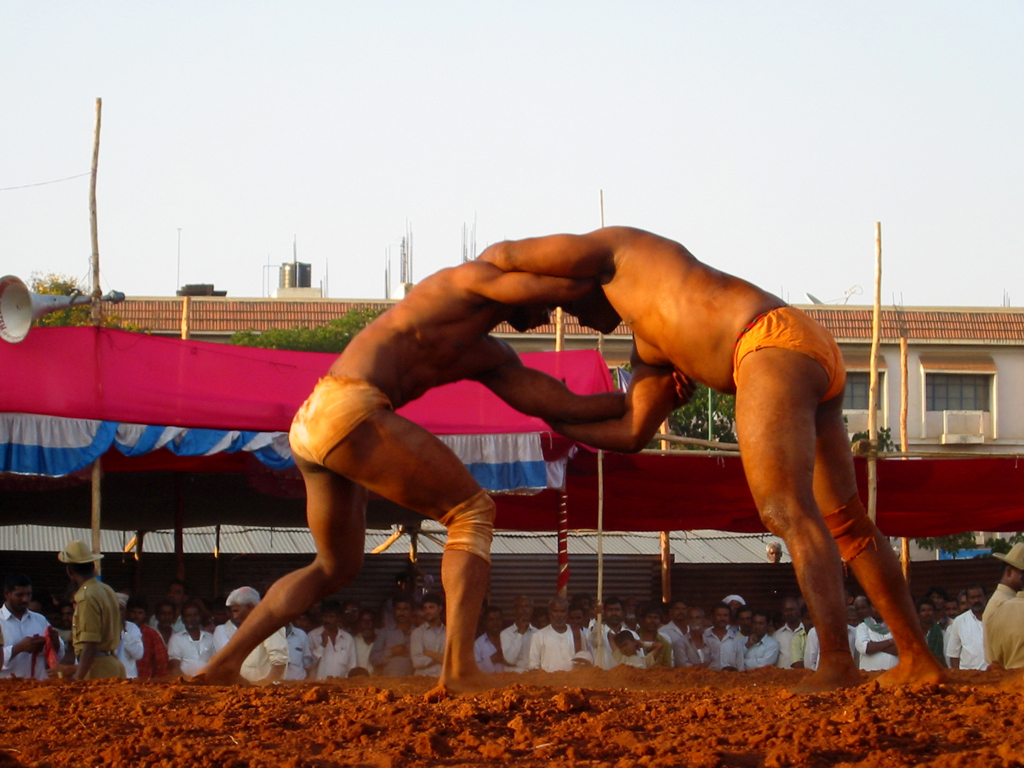
Kushti, an indigenous wrestling practice promoted by practitioners of Indian physical culture.

Muscular Hinduism promoted various sports alongside traditional Indian physical culture at a time when some practitioners of indigenous physical culture were opposed to the recently imported British physical culture and were actively standardising Indian sports for usage in formal competition, with yoga in particular having been somewhat remolded into a tool of physical and martial strengthening. These physical culture practices were pursued in gymkhanas and akhadas.

=== Post-colonial era ===
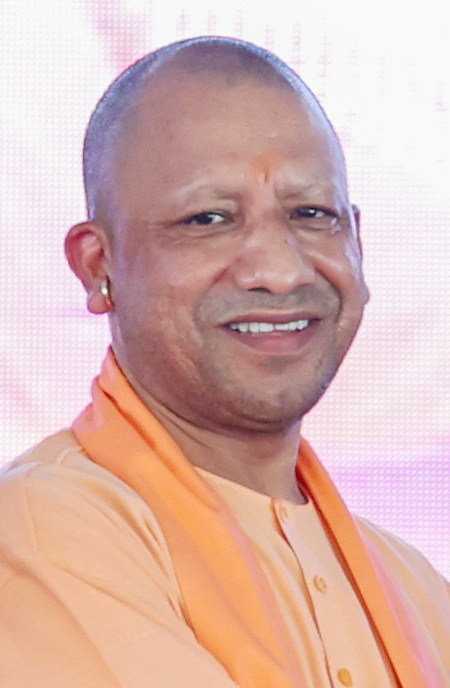
Yogi Adityanath has become the face of Muscular Hinduism as the Chief Minister of Uttar Pradesh.

Muscular Hinduism is supported by the RSS as part of a broader project to remake India free from Islamic & Western influences and further nation-building; this effort takes place in part in opposition to Hindus of a less nationalistic character. The RSS provides paramilitary training for its members. Major Bharatiya Janata Party (BJP) politicians such as Narendra Modi and Yogi Adityanath have been associated with the promotion and execution of Muscular Hinduism at the governmental level.

The muscularity of the narratives present in the Mahabharata, which culminates in a brutal war fought for righteousness, have been propounded to a greater extent in the modern era.

== See also ==
- Hindutva
- Muscular Christianity
- Muscular Judaism
