= Rangers F.C. supporters =

Supporters of Rangers F.C., a Scottish association football club

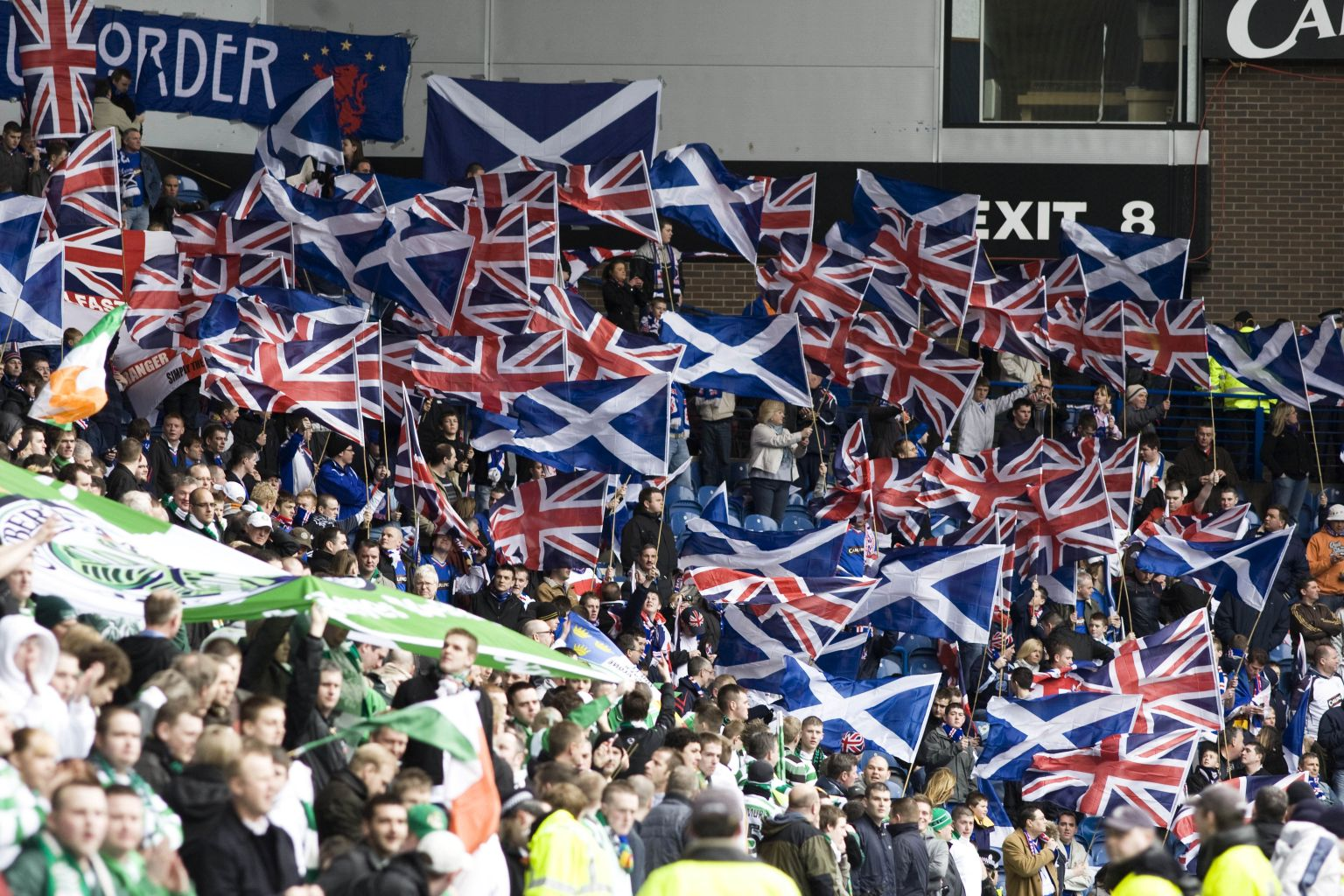
Rangers supporters with a flag display including the Scottish Saltire and the Union Jack at an Old Firm match, 2008

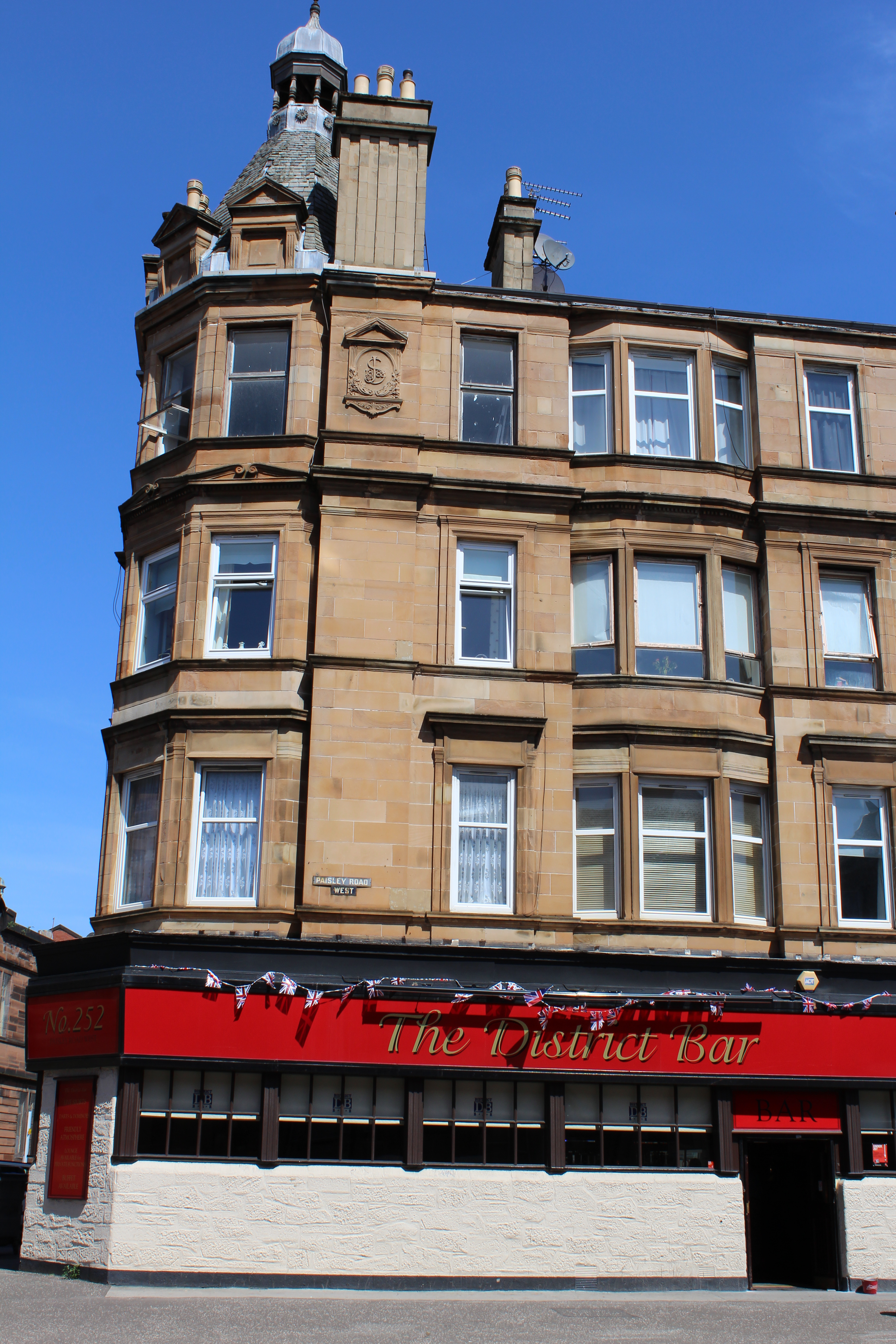
This Rangers-themed bar on Paisley Road West is one of several lining the main thoroughfare between Glasgow city centre and Ibrox Stadium

Rangers Football Club is a Scottish football club based in the city of Glasgow.

The club has a global fan-base, with over 600 supporters clubs ranging from North America, Australasia and the Middle East to those closer to home in the United Kingdom.[1] In 2006, Rangers was one of the best-supported clubs in the UK with an estimated 1.4 million supporters. In season 2012–13, Rangers recorded the 18th highest average league attendance in Europe.

Rangers and their supporters have traditionally been identified with the Protestantism and Unionism.

== Fanbase and attendances ==
Recent average league attendances
Season	Stadium capacity	Average attendance	% of capacity
2003–04	50,411	48,992	97.2%
2004–05	50,411	48,676	96.6%
2005–06	50,411	49,245	97.8%
2006–07	51,082	49,955	97.9%
2007–08	51,082	49,143	96.2%
2008–09	51,082	49,534	97.0%
2009–10	51,082	47,564	93.1%
2010–11	51,082	45,305	88.7%
2011–12	51,082	46,324	90.7%
2012–13	50,987	45,744	89.6%
2013–14	50,987	42,938	84.2%
2014–15	50,947	32,798	64.3%
2015–16	50,947	45,029	88.4%
2016–17	50,947	48,893	95.9%
2017–18	50,817	49,174	96.8%
2018–19	50,817	49,564	97.5%

Rangers, along with Old Firm rivals Celtic, have the largest support base of all the clubs in Scotland. The club's average attendance is consistently one of the highest in Europe, the figure of 45,750 for the domestic league Season 2012–13 being the 18th highest across the continent. A study of stadium attendance figures from 2013 to 2018 by the CIES Football Observatory ranked Rangers at 18th in the world during that period, even though they had been playing at lower levels for three of those five seasons. Rangers' proportion of the distribution of spectators in Scotland was 27.4%, 8th overall for national audience share across the 51 leagues studied (Celtic's figures were even higher, mainly due to their stadium holding approximately 9,000 more seats).

== Notable fans ==
- David MacMillan, Nobel prize winning chemist
- Alex Ferguson, football manager
- Angus Young, AC/DC Australian musician
- Malcolm Young, AC/DC Australian musician
- William Reid, musician - Jesus & Mary Chain
- Mike Tyson, American former professional boxer
- Van Morrison, musician
- Eddie Irvine, F1 Racing driver
- Ian McCallum, Punk Musician, Stiff Little Fingers
- Simon Neil, musician, Biffy Clyro
- Gordon Ramsay, British chef
- Archibald Leitch, famous football stadium Architect
- Denis Law, Footballer, Ballon d'Or winner
- Colin Hay, Scottish, Australian musician - Men at Work
- Isla Fisher, Actress
- Shay Mitchell, Canadian actress
- Maya Jama, TV presenter
- Louise Linton, Actress
- Archie Gemmill, Footballer
- Bradley Wiggins, Olympic cyclist
- Alan McGee, Founding Manager of Oasis
- Sean Connery, Scottish actor
- Kenneth Branagh, Filmmaker and actor
- Carl Frampton, Boxing champion
- Laura Anderson, TV personality
- Patrick Dempsey, Actor
- Jean Johansson, TV presenter & journalist,
- Midge Ure, Musician and Live Aid charity founder
- Luke Littler, Darts champion,
- Dougie Payne, musician Travis
- Derek Forbes, musician Simple Minds
- Cameron Norrie, British tennis player
- Nell McAndrew, Model
- Gregor Townsend, Scotland Rugby Head Coach
- Danni Menzies, Model and TV Presenter
- Lulu, Scottish singer
- Charles Rennie Mackintosh, Architect
- Hugh Grant, Actor,
- Tinchy Stryder, musician
- Amy Macdonald, Scottish singer
- Drew McIntyre, Scottish professional wrestler
- James Arthur, musician
- Jamie Bigg, TV Star, Gladiators
- Colin Montgomerie, Scottish professional golfer
- Willie Thorne, Snooker player
- Clive Anderson, English television and radio presenter
- Alastair Burnet, British journalist and broadcaster
- Andy Cameron, Scottish comedian
- Catriona Shearer, News broadcaster
- Grado, Scottish professional wrestler
- Robbie Fowler, English football manager
- Brian Kerr, Irish football manager
- Kenny Logan, Scottish rugby union player
- Tinie Tempah, musician
- Marti Pellow, Scottish singer
- Tom Stoltman, Scottish strongman
- Jack Bruce, musician, Cream
- Paul Craig, Mixed Martial Artist
- Alan Frew, singer of Glass tiger

=== Record attendances ===
Rangers fans have contributed to a number of records for massive attendances, most notably the highest home attendance for a domestic league fixture in the United Kingdom: 118,567 on 2 January 1939. Ibrox hosted numerous crowds of over 100,000 during the 1950s and 1960s, prior to reconstruction following the Ibrox disaster. Rangers supporters also hold records for the highest attendance at a friendly fixture, 104,679, set at Hampden Park in 1961 vs Eintracht Frankfurt, as well as the largest crowd to watch a non-Cup final fixture, 143,570 for a Scottish Cup semi-final vs. Hibernian in 1948. Rangers hold the world record for a fourth tier match with an attendance of 50,048 against Berwick Rangers during the 2012–13 season.

=== List of Rangers supporters groups ===
Name	Tenure	Notes
Rangers First	2014–2016	Merged to form Club 1872
Rangers Supporters' Trust	2003–2016	Merged to form Club 1872
Club 1872	2016–	Currently the 2nd largest Rangers FC shareholder
Rangers Supporters Assembly	2004–2016	Dissolved as part of Club 1872 formation
Rangers Supporters Association	1946–	
Rangers Fan Board	2014–2016	Dissolved as part of Club 1872 formation

== Disorderly Behaviour ==
=== 2008 UEFA Cup final ===
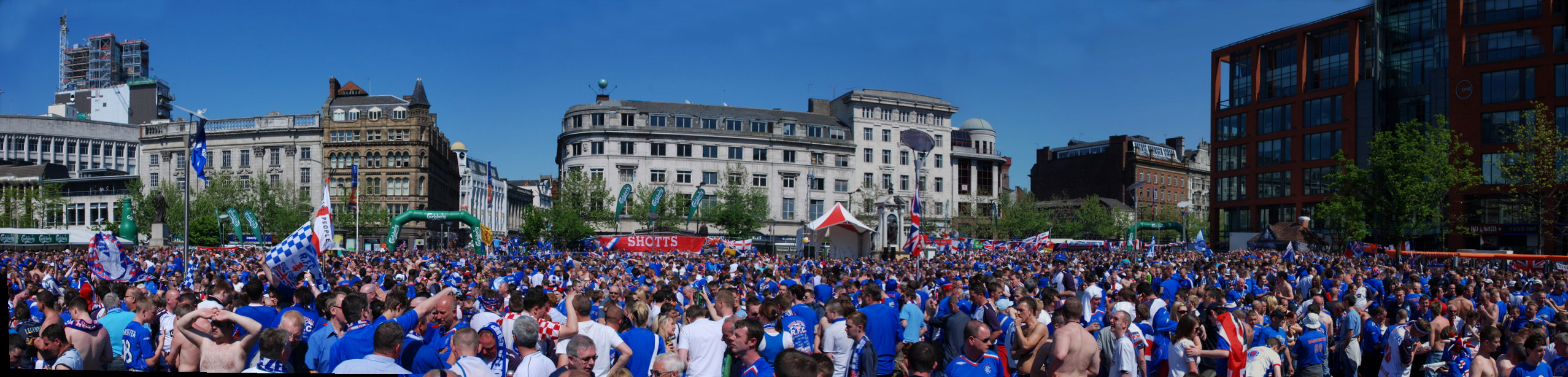

In 2008, up to 200,000 Rangers supporters traveled to Manchester for the UEFA Cup final, with major issues of disturbance and disorder. The match between Rangers and Zenit Saint Petersburg was preceded by mass civil disturbance and vandalism by Rangers supporters and fights between fans.

Rangers chief executive Martin Bain later criticized the protestors, stating: "Those scenes obviously are dreadful and I've seen them myself and we have been informed...that those scenes were caused by supporters that don't normally attach themselves to our support. Rangers security chief Kenny Scott said the club would take "appropriate action" against those responsible.

=== 2021 George Square disorder ===
After winning the 2020–21 Scottish Premiership title in March 2021, Rangers fans were criticised for gathering at Ibrox Stadium and at George Square in central Glasgow, despite public gatherings being prohibited due to the COVID-19 pandemic in Scotland. Instances of violence and disorder were observed, multiple police officers were assaulted, several memorial benches were destroyed during celebrations. In all, police made 28 arrests and handed out fixed penalty notices for a variety of offences including assaulting police officers and sectarian-related breaches of the peace. Scotland's First Minister, Nicola Sturgeon described the scenes as "infuriating and disgraceful".

Having received the Scottish Premiership trophy on 15 May 2021, thousands of Rangers fans gathered at Ibrox in the morning and walked the 3 miles (4.8 km) to George Square to celebrate the team's title success, although this was still not permitted under pandemic regulations and authorities had requested the supporters to stay in their local area. During the alcohol-fuelled celebrations, some supporters became 'unruly' leading to 'violent clashes' with each other, and then with the police after a decision was made to forcibly disperse the group at 9pm, during which several people were violently assaulted, property was vandalised and missiles and flares were thrown at officers. In all, police made 20 arrests on the day with more expected to follow on review of the incidents. Sturgeon condemned these fans for behaving in "a thuggish, sectarian and selfish manner" and for displays of "vile anti-Catholic prejudice".

== Songs and chants ==
Follow follow,
We will follow Rangers,
Everywhere, anywhere,
We will follow on,
Follow follow,
We will follow Rangers,
If they go to Dublin,
We will follow on.

— "Follow Follow" lyrics

Rangers fans' song of choice and most commonly sung is "Follow Follow". This is also the club's official anthem and is played before every home match at Ibrox. Other anthems played at home matches include "Penny Arcade" by Roy Orbison and "Simply the Best" by Tina Turner, which is played as the teams enter the stadium. Rangers adopted this anthem after the club won nine titles in a row in the 1990s and Rangers supporters started a campaign that got the song into the top 10 of the UK singles chart in 2010 to commemorate the club's 53rd title win.

Other songs frequently chanted by Rangers fans include "The Bouncy", which involves bouncing up and down on the spot chanting the word "bouncy" or "let's all do the bouncy" over and over again; "Derry's Walls", a song commemorating the siege of Derry in 1689; and "Every Other Saturday", a song written in the 1960s and originating from an era when Rangers supporters finished work on a Saturday morning, a lot from the River Clyde shipyards, and headed to Ibrox for the afternoon fixture.

=== Sectarian singing ===
Rangers fans have been criticised for singing anti-Catholic songs. The Billy Boys, including the lyrics "We're up to our knees in Fenian blood ... Surrender or you'll die", was included in songs banned by the Scottish government in 2011, but has continued to be sung by fans. Similarly The Famine Song, referring to the 1840s' Great Famine in Ireland, and including the lyric "The famine is over, why don't you go home?", has been sung by Rangers supporters since the 2000s, leading to criticism and legal action.

== Rivalries ==
=== Celtic: Old Firm derby ===
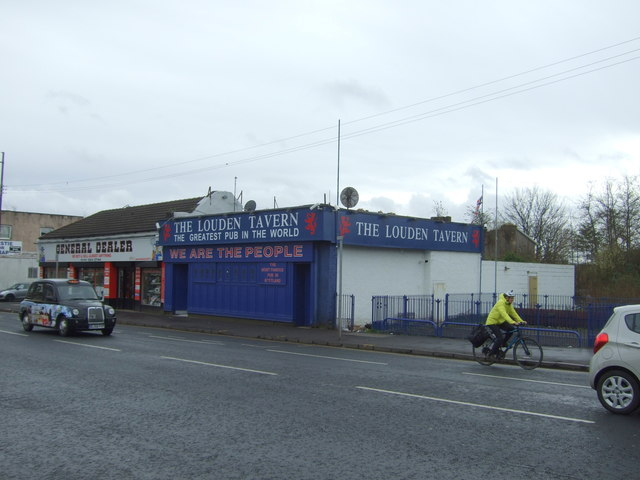
This Rangers pub is located near to Celtic's stadium in Glasgow's East End

The club's most distinct rivalry is with Glasgow neighbours Celtic; the two clubs are collectively known as the Old Firm. Rangers' traditional support is largely drawn from the Protestant Unionist community, whilst Celtic's traditional support is largely drawn from the Catholic Irish community. The first Old Firm match was won by Celtic and there have been over four hundred matches played to date. The Old Firm rivalry has fuelled many assaults, sometimes leading to deaths, on Old Firm derby days; an activist group that monitors sectarian activity in Glasgow has reported that on Old Firm weekends, admissions to hospital emergency rooms have increased over normal levels and journalist Franklin Foer noted that in the period from 1996 to 2003, eight deaths in Glasgow were directly linked to Old Firm matches, as well as hundreds of assaults.

=== Aberdeen ===
The rivalry with Aberdeen began in the late 1970s when the two clubs were among the strongest in Scotland. Relations between fans were further soured during a league match on 8 October 1988, when Aberdeen player Neil Simpson's tackle on Rangers' Ian Durrant resulted in Durrant being injured for two years. Resentment continued and in 1998 an article in Rangers pre-match programme branded Aberdeen fans "scum". Rangers stated that they had "issued a full and unreserved apology" to Aberdeen and their supporters, and this was accepted by Aberdeen. In another incident, then Rangers captain Richard Gough accused Aberdeen of only playing when it was against Rangers. This further increased the hostility between supporters of both clubs, which has continued.

== Sectarianism ==
Until 1989, Rangers informally refused to sign Catholic players, reinforcing its image as a bastion of Protestant identity. In 1989 Mo Johnston, who had previously played for Celtic, signed for Rangers, becoming the first high-profile Catholic player at the club since the First World War. Some Rangers supporters protested at the signing of a Catholic, burning their scarves and saying they would give up their season tickets.

Rangers partnered with Celtic to form the 'Old Firm Alliance', an initiative aimed at educating children from across Glasgow about issues like healthy eating and fitness, as well as awareness of anti-social behaviour, sectarianism and racism. The club's 'Follow With Pride' campaign was launched in 2007 to improve the club's image and build on previous anti-racist, anti-sectarian campaigns. (Note: Racism has been directed at players on the pitch at Rangers games, including at former Celtic player Bobo Balde, and former Rangers player Mark Walters was racially abused by some Celtic and Hearts fans.) William Gallard, UEFA's Director of Communications, commended the SFA and Scottish clubs, including Rangers, for their actions in fighting discrimination. In September 2007, UEFA praised Rangers for the measures the club has taken against sectarianism.

In July 2020, Rangers defender Connor Goldson was criticized by Rangers fans for supporting the Black Lives Matter movement, he described the fans' reaction as 'hate' and 'ignorance', he was supported by ex-Rangers player Maurice Edu, who also expressed his "embarrassment" and "disappointment" with some Rangers fans' reaction to the Black Lives Matter movement. These events led Rangers CEO Stewart Robertson to condemn the racial abuse of Rangers players by stating "if you are unable to support our players, regardless of their background, you are not welcome at Ibrox". Rangers fans are very proud of their signings of varying cultures including Walter Tull. Tull, who served as one of the British Army's first black combat officers during World War I, signed for Rangers on February 2, 1917, while on leave. For the modern post-war era, Mark Walters was signed by Graeme Souness in December 1987 and unfortunately faced racial abuse from Celtic fans on his debut.

== Politics ==
Rangers have historically embodied a strong Protestant, unionist and monarchist identity, deeply intertwined with British Loyalism in Scotland and Northern Ireland. Academics argue that the club has long served as a symbolic expression of Britishness in Scotland, often associated with the political right and the Conservative Party. Supporters frequently express their unionist and Orange affiliations through songs, emblems and banners, with many fans attending sectarian Orange Order events and adopting symbols such as the Union Jack and slogans like "We are the people." In the 2000s, Rangers fanzines like Follow Follow openly promoted a loyalist and right-wing agenda. Surveys from 1990 and 2001 showed Rangers fans to be the most likely in Scotland to support the Conservative Party, oppose a British withdrawal from Northern Ireland and oppose the Scottish National Party.

In contrast to Celtic supporters, some of whom are known to support Palestinian Nationalism and wave Palestinian flags at games, many Rangers supporters have aligned to Israel and wave Israeli flags.
