= St Luke's Church, Walton =

Coordinates: 53.4396°N 2.9670°W

St Luke's Church
- Church of St Luke the Evangelist, Walton-on-the-Hill
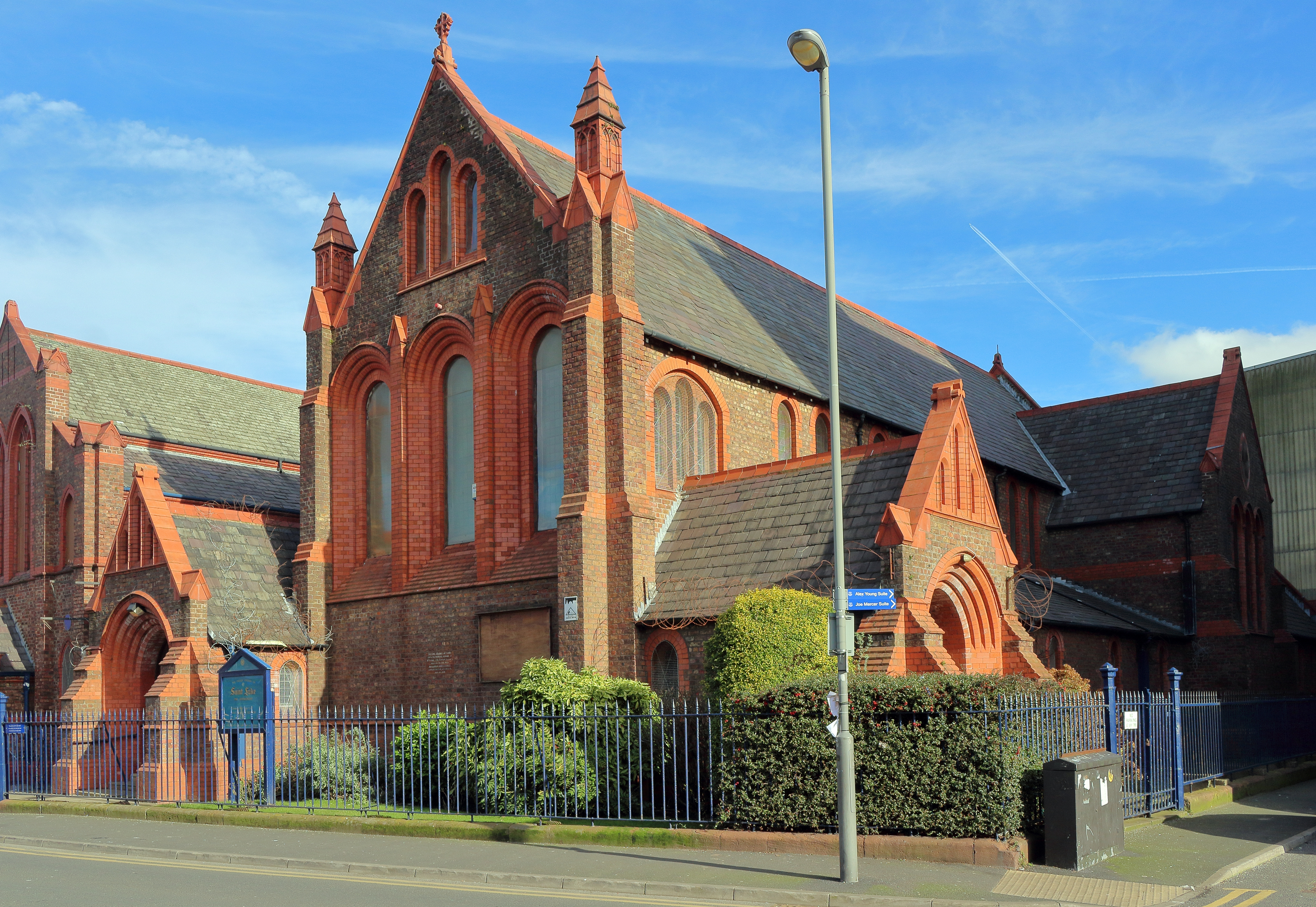
- St Luke's Church at Goodison Park

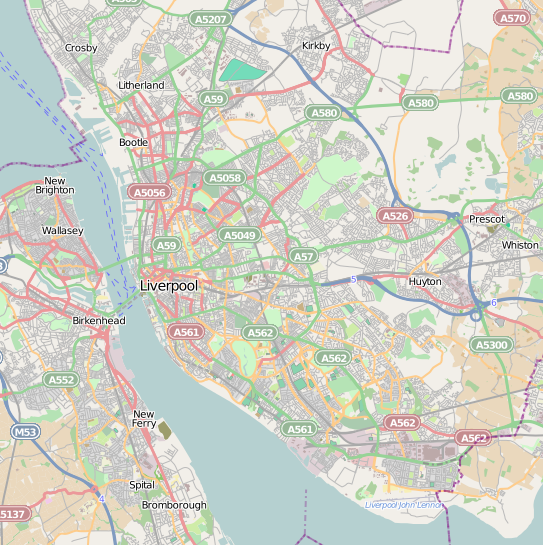
- Location in Liverpool
- OS grid reference: SJ 35861 94081
- Location: Goodison Road, Walton, Liverpool
- Country: England
- Denomination: Anglican

History
- Status: Parish church
- Founded: 1901
- Dedication: St Luke the Evangelist

Administration
- Province: York
- Diocese: Liverpool
- Archdeaconry: Liverpool
- Deanery: Liverpool North and Walton
- Parish: St Luke the Evangelist, Walton-on-the-Hill

Clergy
- Rector: Lynn Davidson

The Church of St Luke the Evangelist, Walton-on-the-Hill, more commonly St Luke's Church, is an Anglican church in Walton, Liverpool, England; it is enclosed on two sides by Everton Football Club's ground Goodison Park.

The church is located between the Gwladys Street End and Goodison Road stands of Goodison Park. It serves the community of a small but densely populated parish. The church enjoys a good relationship with Everton Football Club. On regular match days, the church opens up two and a half hours before kick off for supporters to come and have a cup of tea or just a sit down. Everton do not play games early on a Sunday to avoid clashing with the church's regular services.

The church has a remembrance garden, which backs onto the Gwladys Street End Stand. Here ashes of parishioners and Everton fans the world over are placed in the garden according to Church of England custom and practice. The garden is open on request and offers peace and tranquility for families of those who are remembered there. Plaques are made representing all those whose ashes have been sent in or in some instances, shrubs and plants are planted.

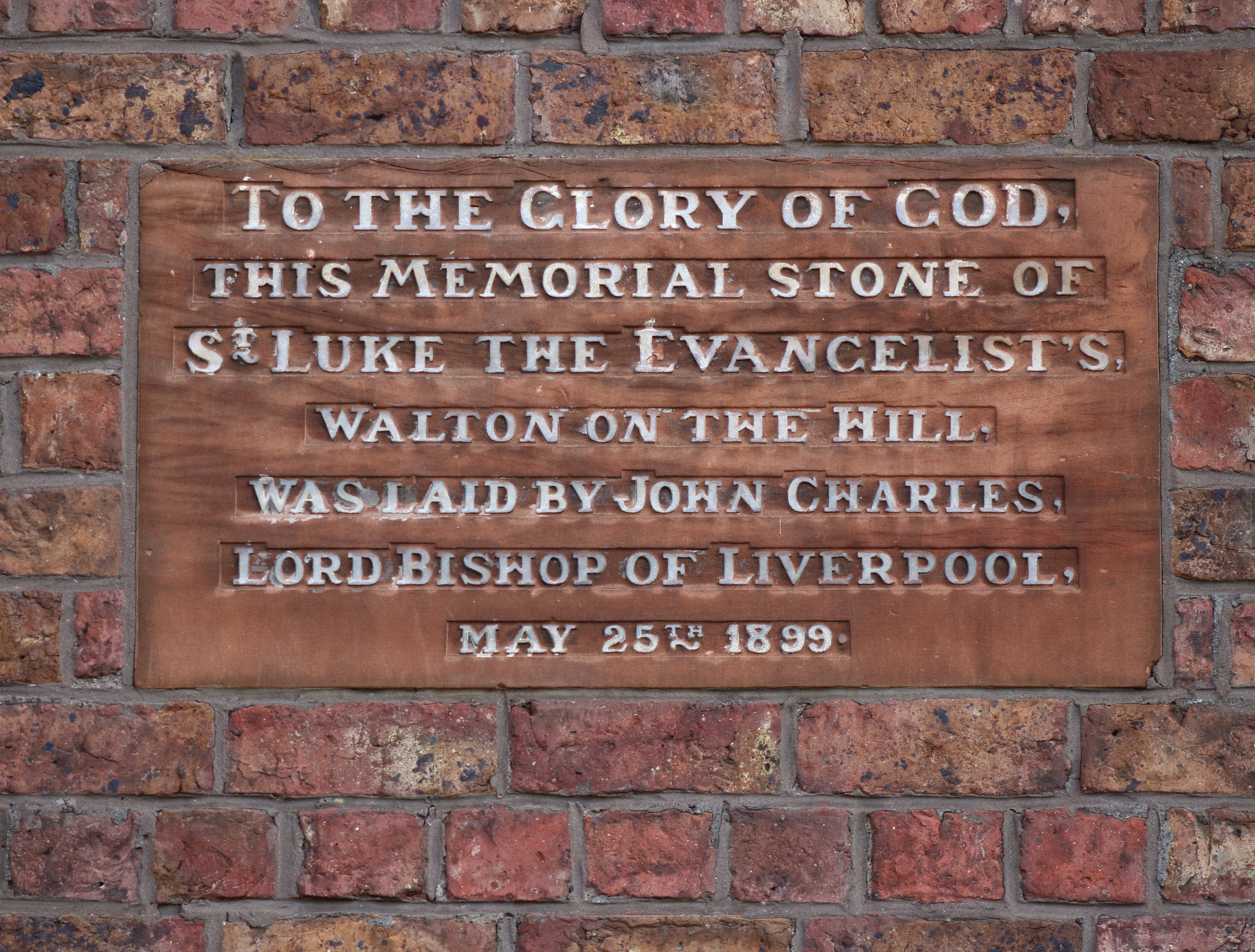
The church's foundation stone
