= William Orcutt Cushing =

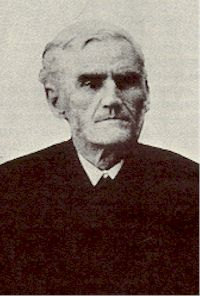
- William O. Cushing
- Born: 31 December 1823; Hingham, Massachusetts, United States
- Died: 19 October 1902 (aged 78); Searsburg, New York, United States
- Spouse: Hena
- Religion: Christian
- Church: Unitarian
- Writings: 300 Hymns
- Offices held: Unitarian minister
- Title: Pastor

William Orcutt Cushing (31 December 1823 – 19 October 1902) was an American Unitarian minister and hymn writer from Hingham, Massachusetts.

== Personal life ==
Cushing was born in 1823 in Hingham to Unitarian parents. When he was a teenager and started to read The Bible alone, he became a follower of the Orthodox Christian school of thought. When he was 18, he stated that he felt that God wanted him to become a minister.

Cushing remained true to Christian principles throughout his life. He once gave all of his life savings of $1,000 (approximately $18,400 in 2013) to a blind girl in order for her to receive an education.

== Ministry ==
Cushing started his training to become a Unitarian minister based along his parents' theology. His first posting as an ordained minister was to Searsburg, New York, west of Trumansburg. There he met his future wife, Hena, and they were married in 1854. In the same year, Cushing wrote his first hymn, "When he Cometh", based on Malachi 3:17, for children in his Sunday School.

Cushing then later went on to minister in a number of locations around New York until 1870 when Hena died, requiring Cushing to return to Searsburg. Shortly afterwards, Cushing suffered from a "creeping paralysis" that caused him to lose his voice, requiring him to retire from the ministry after 27 years in it.

== Hymn writing ==
After having to retire from the ministry, Cushing asked God for something to do to occupy his time. He discovered he had a talent for hymn writing and made that a way to keep busy after work in the ministry. Throughout the rest of his life, Cushing wrote 300 hymns including "The Name of Jesus" and "Home at Last". In 1880, he co-wrote "Follow On" with Robert Lowry and W. Howard Doane. This hymn became popular and was associated with The Salvation Army; its tune was adopted by Scottish association football club, Rangers as the basis for their club anthem, "Follow Follow".

== Death ==
Cushing died on 19 October 1902 in Lisbon Center, New York. He was buried in the Jones Cemetery, near Searsburg.
