= Follow On (hymn) =

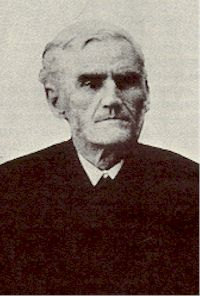
- William Orcutt Cushing
- Genre: Baptist hymn
- Written: 1898
- Text: William Orcutt Cushing
- Based on: Hosea 6:3
- Meter: 12.12.13.11 with refrain
- Melody: Robert Lowry; W. Howard Doane
- Composed: 1880

"Follow On", also known in certain cases as "Down In The Valley With My Saviour I Would Go" and "I Will Follow Jesus", is a Christian hymn written in 1878 by William Orcutt Cushing. The music for it was composed in 1880 by both Robert Lowry and W. Howard Doane.

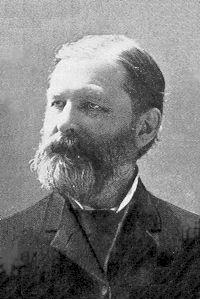
Robert Lowry

== History ==
The hymn was originally written as a Baptist hymn and it is also used by the Salvation Army. The lyrics are based on the Biblical verse in Hosea 6:3.

Then we shall know,
If we follow on to know the LORD:
his going forth is prepared as the morning,
and he shall come unto us as the rain,
as the latter and former rain unto the earth

Cushing wrote this hymn in New York after he became a Christian minister in 1854; he started writing hymns in 1870 when his health declined, forcing him to retire. He wrote more than three hundred hymns.

Cushing once said about his inspiration to write it:

Longing to give up all for Christ who had given his life for me, I wanted to be willing to lay everything at his feet, with no wish but to do his will, to live henceforth only for his glory. Out of this feeling came the hymn, ‘Follow On.’ It was written with the prayer and the hope that some heart might by it be led to give up all for Christ. Much of the power and usefulness of the hymn, however, are due to Mr. Lowry, who put it into song.

== Present day ==
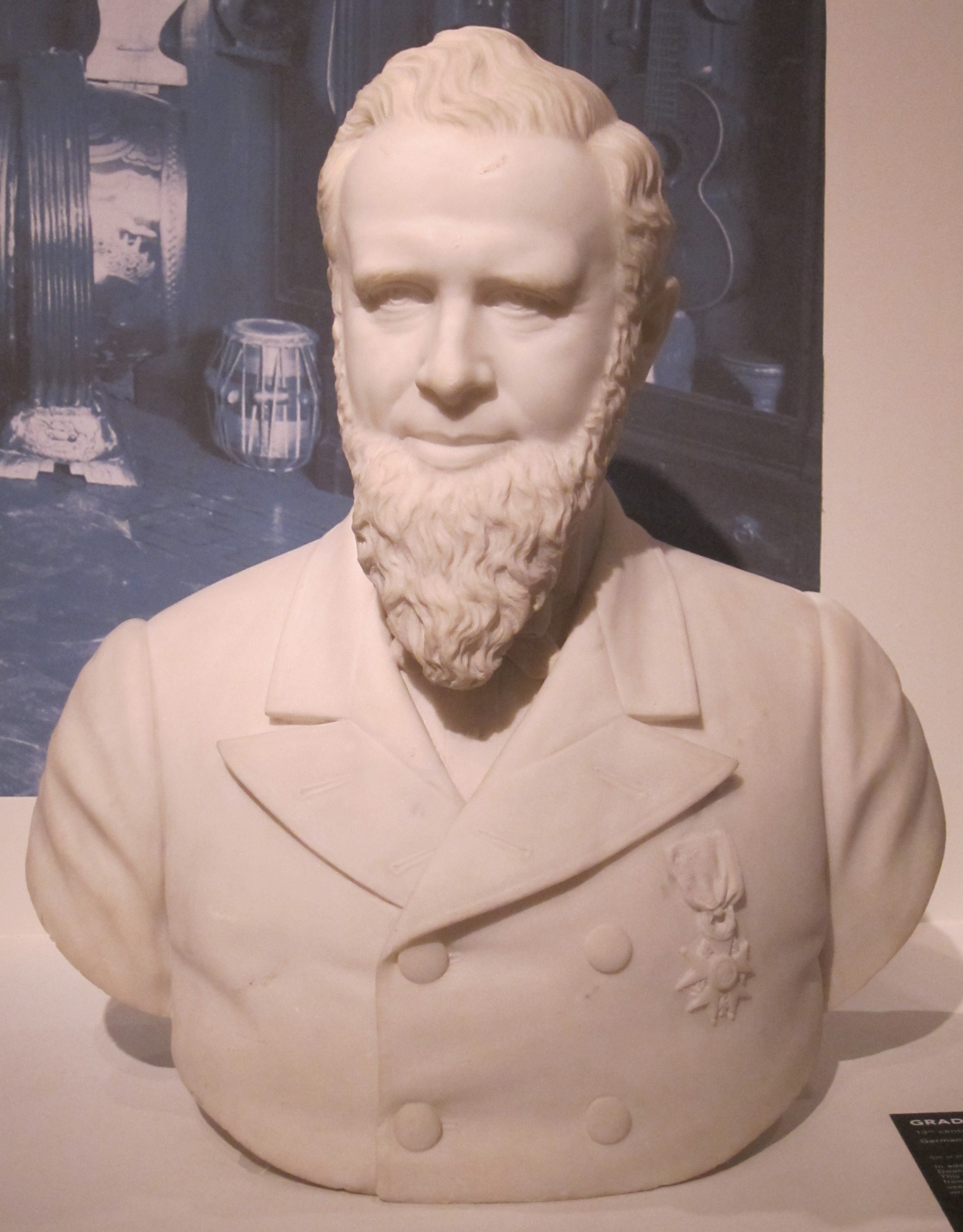
William Howard Doane

The hymn started to get dropped from certain hymn books during the 1960s; however it is still contained in Baptist hymnals. There is now a movement to bring back certain traditional hymns such as "Follow On" into current usage.

The hymn's music has been adopted for the anthem of the Scottish association football club, Rangers, in their club anthem, "Follow Follow". There have been disagreements over the Rangers fans' usage of the hymn's music as their anthem with claims such as from the Boys' Brigade complaining that using it and changing the lyrics prevented it from remaining a major hymn in their organization because of the association with Rangers. The original hymn was sung at their Ibrox Stadium in Glasgow on 3 January 2011 at a memorial service for the sixty-six victims of the Ibrox disaster and their families and friends.
