= Everton F.C. supporters =

Everton Football Club is an English professional football club based in Liverpool that competes in the Premier League, the top tier of English football. Supporters of the club are known as Evertonians or "Toffees". Everton take their name from the district of Everton in Liverpool where it was originally formed. Everton's nickname is the Toffees, or sometimes the Toffeemen. This comes from one of two toffee shops that were located in Everton village at the time the club was founded.

== Demographics ==
Everton has a large fan base by virtue of being an original founder member of The Football League and contesting more seasons in the top flight than any other club. For the first nine seasons in the football league, Everton had the highest average league attendances of any team in England. The club recently averaged attendances of around 36,000 to 38,000 in league games at their home stadium Goodison Park, which had a capacity of 39,572, despite having some obstructed views and poor sight lines. A 2006–07 fan survey by the Premier League listed 15% of Everton fans as being unhappy with sight lines at Goodison Park, and only 19% described match views as "very good".

For the 2009–10 season, Everton sold over 24,000 season tickets. For the 2016–17 season, this had been upped to 31,000. In the same season, around 7,000 Evertonians travelled to Lisbon for a match against Benfica. The highest ever season average attendance at Everton was in 1963 with 51,603, the best of any club in that particular season. The following season, the club was once again the best supported side in England.

The 2004–05 Premier League survey, which asked almost 1,400 Everton fans various questions, found that 30% of those fans lived in Liverpool. The 2007–08 survey found that Everton fans on average live 44 miles away from Goodison Park, three miles less than the average and a huge difference compared with fans of rivals Liverpool and Manchester United, who were on average 82 and 78 miles from their respective stadiums. Everton draws the vast majority of its support from Merseyside, Cheshire, Southern parts of Lancashire, Western enclaves of Greater Manchester and North Wales. Everton also has a notable number of supporters in countries such as Australia, Ireland, South Africa, Thailand, and the United States.

The 2003–04 survey found that 71% of Everton fans earn under £30,000 a year, the lowest average income in the league. The 2002–03 report found Everton had the highest number of season ticket holders from the two lowest social classifications with 16%. A study in August 2012 by property website Zoopla found that houses around Goodison Park were the cheapest of any Premier League club, averaging £66,000, almost £30,000 less than the entry above it.

=== Social media ===
In 2009, Everton became the first Premier League club to set up an official Facebook page. As of July 2026, the club has the following social media statistics:

Platform	Followers	Link
Bluesky	12,700	Everton on Bluesky
Facebook	5.1 million	Everton on Facebook
Instagram	3.3 million	Everton on Instagram
Threads	615,000	Everton on Threads
TikTok	5.5 million	Everton on TikTok
Twitter	2.9 million	Everton on Twitter
WhatsApp	257,000	Everton on WhatsApp
YouTube	981,000	Everton on YouTube

== Rivalries ==
A 2003 survey by The Football Fans Census found that Liverpool are still Everton's main rivals. The Merseyside derby (the intra-city rivalry between the two teams) is commonly referred to as "the friendly derby" as it is common for families and households in the city to have both Everton and Liverpool fans. Whilst performances on the pitch are heated and passionate, the off-pitch behaviour of fans is largely amicable in comparison to other rivalries, and it is one of the few Premier League match-ups that does not require the enforcement of total fan segregation during the matches.

== Fan clubs ==
Everton have fan clubs located all over the world. The three largest clubs outside England are Emerald Everton Supporters Club in Ireland, ESCNI in Northern Ireland, and the Everton Supporters Club on the Isle of Man.

== Notable supporters ==
=== Footballers ===
- Bosse Andersson
- John Bailey
- Eirik Bakke
- Michael Ball
- Ross Barkley
- Joey Barton
- Jim Bentley
- Delial Brewster
- Nathan Broadhead
- Harry Charsley
- Luca Connell
- Tom Davies
- Dixie Dean
- John Ebbrell
- Phil Edwards
- Gareth Farrelly
- Morgan Feeney
- Danny Fox
- Ronnie Goodlass
- Tony Grant
- Colin Harvey
- Wayne Hennessey
- Tony Hibbert
- Dave Hickson
- Andy Holden
- Lewis Holtby
- Barry Horne
- Eddie Howe
- Bryan Hughes
- Francis Jeffers
- Dave Jones
- Jonjoe Kenny
- Brian Labone
- Adam Lallana
- Callum Lang
- Henrik Larsson
- Anders Limpar
- Mick Lyons
- Cliff Marshall
- Jay McEveley
- Steve McMahon
- Callum McManaman
- Billy Meredith
- Derek Mountfield
- Tony Morley
- Carlo Nash
- David Nugent
- Iffy Onuora
- Billy Paynter
- Kevin Ratcliffe
- Gary Roberts
- Jack Rodwell
- Wayne Rooney
- Joe Royle
- Kevin Sheedy
- Gylfi Sigurðsson
- Neville Southall
- Gary Speed
- Alan Stubbs
- Derek Temple
- Mickey Thomas
- David Thompson
- Lee Trundle
- David Unsworth
- Roy Vernon
- Mike Walker
- Jonathan Walters
- Tony Warner
- Ian Woan
- Stephen Wright
- Eddie Youds

=== Actors and entertainers ===
- Jake Abraham, actor
- Paul Angelis, actor
- Helena Bonham Carter, actress
- Alan Clarke, director
- Jodie Comer, actress
- Kenneth Cope, actor
- Matt Damon, actor
- Bill Dean, actor
- Judi Dench, actress
- Jennifer Ellison, actress
- Andrew Gower, actor
- Amanda Holden, television presenter
- Gordon Honeycombe, newscaster, writer
- John Hurt, actor
- Rob James-Collier, actor
- Gethin Jones, television presenter
- Michael B. Jordan, actor
- Dolph Lundgren, actor
- Roger McGough, poet
- Victor McGuire, actor
- Jimmy Mulville, comedian
- Sam Nivola, actor
- Simon O'Brien, television presenter
- Tom O'Connor, comedian
- Mike Parry, radio presenter
- Leonard Rossiter, actor
- Jenny Seagrove, actress
- Will Sliney, comic book artist
- Sylvester Stallone, actor
- Freddie Starr, comedian
- Ed Stewart, broadcaster
- Claire Sweeney, actress
- Finty Williams, actress

=== Musicians ===
- Ian Astbury, The Cult
- Ian Ball, Gomez
- Pete Best, The Beatles
- John Lennon, The Beatles
- Justin Bieber, singer
- DMA's, band
- Paul Draper, Mansun
- Gang of Youths, band
- Samuel T. Herring, Future Islands
- She Drew the Gun, band
- George Harrison, The Beatles
- Shane MacGowan, The Pogues
- Paul McCartney, The Beatles, Wings
- Liz McClarnon, Atomic Kitten
- Damon Minchella, Ocean Colour Scene
- Keith Mullin, The Farm
- Nas, rapper
- Howie Payne, musician
- Osmo Tapio Räihälä, composer
- Donny Tourette, Towers of London
- Circa Waves, band
- The Wombats, band

=== Politicians ===
- Joe Anderson, former mayor of Liverpool
- Lord Brendan Barber former General Secretary of the Trades Union Congress
- Andy Burnham, Prime Minister of the United Kingdom and former Mayor of Greater Manchester
- Mark Carney, Prime Minister of Canada and former Bank of England governor
- Nigel Dodds, former DUP MP for North Belfast constituency
- Chan Chun Sing, Minister for Trade and Industry (Singapore)
- Derek Hatton, former Labour Deputy Leader of Liverpool City Council
- Eric Heffer, former Labour MP for Liverpool Walton
- Steven Norris, former Conservative MP for Oxford East

=== Other sportspeople ===
- Eddie Alvarez, mixed martial artist
- Jake Ball, cricketer
- Tony Bellew, boxer
- Riddick Bowe, boxer
- Robbie Brookside, professional wrestler
- Ian Cockbain, cricketer
- John Conteh, boxer
- Bryan Danielson, professional wrestler
- Matt Dawson, rugby union player
- Sophie Ecclestone, cricketer
- Tommy Fleetwood, golfer
- Jeff Hardy, professional wrestler
- Tom Hartley, cricketer
- Austin Healey, rugby union player
- John Higgins, snooker
- Clive Lloyd, cricketer
- Drake Maverick, professional wrestler
- Molly McCann, mixed martial artist
- John McEnroe, tennis player
- Iafeta Paleaaesina, rugby league player
- John Parrott, snooker player
- Alexei Popyrin, tennis player

=== Journalists ===
- Roger Bennett, journalist
- Henry McDonald, writer
- Elton Welsby, sports presenter

=== Businesspeople ===
- Terry Leahy, former CEO of Tesco

== In popular culture ==
- Ken Loach's 1968 docu-drama The Golden Vision concerned a group of Everton fans and was named after Alex Young, who also appears on-screen.
- The Rutles, a parody of Beatlemania, sees Eric Idle interviewing respected Liverpool poet Roger McGough (a real life Evertonian). He introduces him to the camera as "he was born in Liverpool, grew up in Liverpool, drank in Liverpool, wrote about Liverpool and his football team is of course... Everton".
- The 1997 television drama The Fix told the story of the exposure of a match fixing scandal in 1963 that centred around Everton player Tony Kay. Jason Isaacs (himself a Liverpool fan) played Kay while Colin Welland portrayed then manager Harry Catterick with a broad Liverpool accent, despite the fact Catterick himself was from Darlington. The drama also featured lifelong Liverpool fan Ricky Tomlinson playing Gordon, a fictitious character and Everton fanatic.
- A 1972 episode of BBC Sitcom The Liver Birds, "Liverpool or Everton", which features future Everton chairman and actor Bill Kenwright playing a Liverpool supporter dating Sandra who has to endure Evertonian Beryl and her friends returning home celebrating a derby win.
- Coronation Street villain Pat Phelan was revealed to be an Everton fan, to the extent of having Gary Lineker's face tattooed on his bottom.
- 2017 ITV drama Little Boy Blue focused on the murder of Rhys Jones. The series recreated the Jones family appeal for information and the minute's silence and applause at Goodison Park.
