= Muscular Christianity =

Socioreligious movement

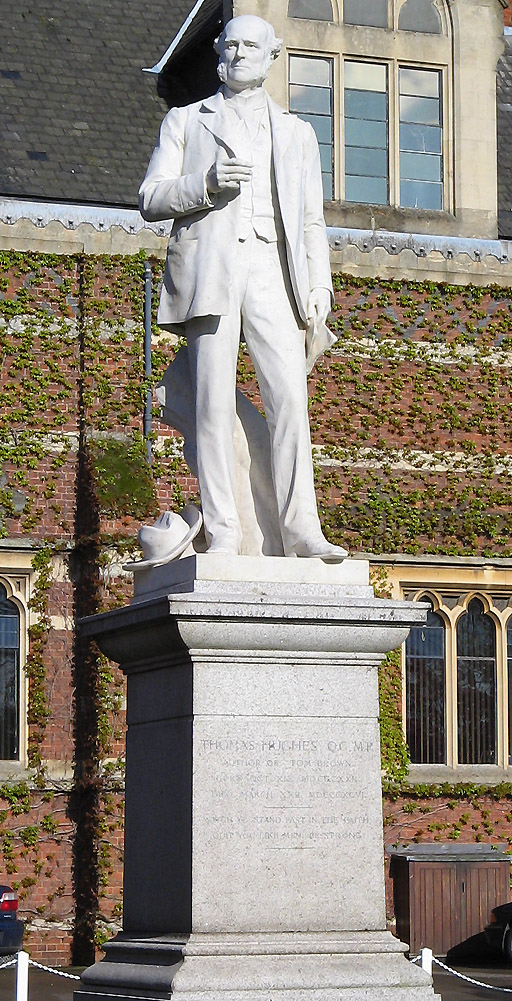
Statue of Thomas Hughes at Rugby School. Hughes's 1857 novel Tom Brown's School Days did much to promote muscular Christianity throughout the English-speaking world.

Muscular Christianity is a term applied to a religious movement that originated in England in the mid-19th century. It is an approach to life and social outreach which emphasizes the benefits of sport and other physical exercise to personal wellbeing, and as a healthy expression of masculinity. It is accompanied by a belief in discipline, duty and self-sacrifice. The term has been disliked by many of its practitioners.

The movement came into vogue during the Victorian era as a method of building character in pupils at English public schools. It is most often associated with English author Thomas Hughes and his 1857 novel Tom Brown's School Days, as well as writers Charles Kingsley and Ralph Connor.

Connor, Kingsley, and Hughes promoted physical strength and health as well as an active pursuit of Christian ideals in personal life and politics. Muscular Christianity has continued through organizations that combine physical and Christian spiritual development. It is influential within both Catholicism and Protestantism.

The movement does not have a central organization or codified philosophy, though the YMCA is one of the most influential.

== Origins and background ==
A mural in a YMCA emphasizing godliness and physical health

Until the Age of Enlightenment, the aesthetics of the body within Christianity were concerned chiefly with holy suffering. Asceticism and the denial of bodily needs and beauty were of interest to laity and clergy alike in ancient history and the Middle Ages. A key tenet of asceticism is believing the flesh to be a distraction from divinity. Sects such as Catharism believed the flesh to be wholly corrupted.

The Muscular Christianity movement was never officially organized. Instead, it was a cultural trend that manifested in different ways and was supported by various figures and churches. Muscular Christianity can be traced back to Paul the Apostle, who used athletic metaphors to describe the challenges of a Christian life. However, the explicit advocacy of sport and exercise in Christianity did not appear until 1762, when Rousseau's Emile described physical education as important for the formation of moral character.

== Definitions and etymology ==
The term Muscular Christianity became well known in a review by barrister T. C. Sandars of Kingsley's novel Two Years Ago in the February 21, 1857, issue of the Saturday Review. The term had appeared slightly earlier. Kingsley wrote a reply to this review in which he calls the term "painful, if not offensive", but he later used it favorably on occasion.

In addition to the beliefs stated above, Muscular Christianity preached the spiritual value of sports, especially team sports. As Kingsley said, "games conduce, not merely to physical, but to moral health". An article on a popular 19th-century Briton sums it up thus: "John MacGregor is perhaps the finest specimen of Muscular Christianity that this or any other age has produced. Three men seemed to have struggled within his breast—the devout Christian, the earnest philanthropist, the enthusiastic athlete."

Despite having gained some support, the concept was still controversial. For one example, a reviewer mentions "the ridicule which the 'earnest' and the 'muscular' men are doing their best to bring on all that is manly", though he prefers "'earnestness' and 'muscular Christianity'" to 18th-century propriety. For another, a clergyman at Cambridge University horsewhipped another clergyman after hearing that he had said grace without mentioning Jesus because a Jew was present. A commentator said, "All this comes, we fear, of Muscular Christianity."

== Thomas Hughes ==
Kingsley's contemporary Thomas Hughes is credited with helping to establish the main tenets of Muscular Christianity in Tom Brown at Oxford, which are physical manliness, chivalry, and masculinity of character. In Tom Brown at Oxford, Hughes states "The Muscular Christians have hold of the old chivalrous and Christian belief, that a man's body is given to him to be trained and brought into subjection, and then used for the protection of the weak, the advancement of all righteous causes, and the subduing of the earth which God has given to the children of men." The notion of protecting the weak was related to contemporary English concerns over the plight of the poor and Christian responsibility to one's neighbour.

== England ==
The idea of Muscular Christianity first started in England amidst industrialization and urbanization. Like their American counterparts, Christians in England were worried about the decrease in manliness among their followers as a result of Puritan influences, including passive virtues like love and tenderness, causing Muscular Christianity to become a cultural trend. It was not started by any specific person but rather supported by churches and many individual Christian figures who then spread it to other congregations. At the time it was believed that physical training built stamina necessary to perform service for others and that physical strength led to moral strength and good character. Christians increasingly felt that athletics could be a good outlet for burning off steam rather than finding a less moral outlet. Sports also helped to recruit new members into the church. Churches began forming their own sports teams and had the associated facilities for them built in or around the churches themselves. This is how YMCA (Young Men's Christian Association) began in 1844 in London, although it did not yet have sports facilities until 1869 with the establishment of New York City's YMCA.

These associations became very popular, and YMCAs began appearing across the country. In 1894, an Anglican vicar, Reverend Arthur Osborne Montgomery Jay, built a gymnasium with a boxing ring in the basement of his East-End London church—Holy Trinity Shoreditch, organized a boxing club and hosted large and popular boxing tournaments. Similar boxing outreach programs were established in the late-19th and early-20th centuries by Christian churches of various denominations in poor or working class areas of Britain and America. These outreach efforts drew in many men, particularly younger men, to not only box but to be ministered to as well.

By 1901, Muscular Christianity was influential enough that one author could praise "the Englishman going through the world with rifle in one hand and Bible in the other" and add, "if asked what our muscular Christianity has done, we point to the British Empire." Muscular Christianity spread to other countries in the 19th century. It was well entrenched in Australian society by 1860, though not always with much recognition of the religious element.

== Canada ==
In what was then Upper Canada (later Ontario), Muscular Christianity appeared first in literature geared towards urban middle-class citizens detailing the exploits of lumberjacks as frontiersmen, positioning them as icons of masculinity for the purpose of keeping urbanites from being 'soft.' The admirable characteristics that the lumberjacks had which made them so masculine were their economic importance and their ability to shape nature as they need it, with nature itself being viewed as more pure than urban centers and their easily accessed sins. The literature that came out of this would create an image of what it meant to be a Canadian man through the use of tropes, archetypes, and values that were all rooted in Muscular Christian ideals.

The first implementation of Muscular Christian ideals by government in Canada was the implementation of military drill into the curriculum of all-boys schools, with the first practitioner being Upper Canada College in 1863. It would not take long for other schools to follow suit, though at this point of the region's development, the majority of schools were modeled after British grammar schools, which were primarily Protestant. These Anglican schools would continue to promote more physical aspects of education in the 1880s, the most popular sport of the time being cricket, because it was a traditional aristocratic game that was favored by the upper classes before it was even implemented in schools.

While girls and women saw very little of Muscular Christianity in the beginning, it was being pushed for as early as 1879 by George Grant, the principal of Queen's University. Before the influence of the movement, such an idea would have been quickly rejected, as sports were viewed as 'unladylike,' however Grant hoped that Muscular Christianity had led to the idea of physical individualism being much more acceptable, though it would take until the 20th century for his ideas to truly take off. However, the inclusion of girls and women in sport would have other effects as Muscular Christianity became more influential, with one of the most profound effects being the increased support in women's suffrage movements.

In what would become Alberta, Muscular Christianity was seen socially before it was actively encouraged by any form of institution (such as the YMCA), displayed mostly in their definition of masculinity, which during the 1840s-1880s consisted of being a gentleman, following Christian principles, and being an upstanding citizen. It would not be until 1898 when the first major establishment was unofficially founded in Edmonton, known as the Edmonton Young Men's Institute (EYMI) by John A. McDougall. This institute in particular would only last five years before being dissolved, with the past leadership being the driving force behind establishing a branch of the YMCA in Edmonton. This would be greatly received by the ever-growing middle-class of the time, as sport was growing more popular as a way of displaying and developing one's masculinity, both by performing physical feats and remaining sportsmanlike. This blend of physicality and religion would remain prominent until the First World War, which would lead to a decline in the religious aspects of the YMCA in Alberta.

It took substantially longer for schools in Quebec to feel the effects of Muscular Christianity, as schools initially had no physical portions mixed in, instead they were based on the classical French curriculum which neglected athletics at the time. These schools were fundamentally different from those in Ontario, with the biggest difference being the prevalence of Catholicism over Protestantism, which slowed the spread of Muscular Christianity because it was not distinctly Catholic from the beginning. The very nature of the school system in Quebec was also different, as it catered heavily to working-class families, who were already a lot more physically active than those who were considered significantly wealthier. With that being said, athleticism would be integrated by the late 19th century in an effort to promote masculinity in young men, though it would take until the turn of the century for sport to become widespread across the province.

== United States ==
In the United States, it appeared first in private schools and then in YMCA and in the preaching of evangelists such as Dwight L. Moody. Scholar Irén Annus links the growth of Muscular Christianity in the United States to broader societal changes which were occurring throughout the country, including the emancipation of women and the influx of immigrants who worked blue-collar jobs while white Anglo-Saxon Protestant (WASP) men became increasingly white-collar. These factors contributed to increasing anxiety over masculinity among WASPs in the United States. Parodied by Sinclair Lewis in Elmer Gantry (though he had praised Oberlin College YMCA for its "positive earnest muscular Christianity") and out of step with theologians such as Reinhold Niebuhr, its influence declined in American mainline Protestantism.

Baylor University scholar Paul Putz summarises the purpose of Muscular Christianity as a mode to sanctify sports, positing that Muscular Christianity "sanctioned the physical activity of sports by giving it moral and religious value. Muscular Christians said that sports were not inherently sinful, nor were they simply entertainment and recreation; instead sports could be a way to develop and grow Christian character. You could become a better Christian through sport participation." An early pioneer was Amos Alonzo Stagg, a Yale-educated football coach who in the 1880s sought to promote "Christian ideals" anchored in US middle-class values such as "cooperation, belief in God, initiative, self-discipline, loyalty, respect for authority, courage, honesty."

President Theodore Roosevelt was raised in a household that practised Muscular Christianity and became a prominent promoter and adherent of the movement. Roosevelt believed "there is little place in active life for the timid good man", a sentiment echoed by many at the time. Followers of Muscular Christianity ultimately found that the only solution to this was to connect faith to the physicality of the body. Roosevelt believed that a strong presence of masculinity along with Christian beliefs were extremely important for American society. Despite presenting himself as Christian, Roosevelt also promoted physical activity as he was pro-war, and believed that an active population was more likely to be victorious in armed conflict.

Fred Smith, a YMCA leader, organized the Men and Religion Forward Movement in 1910. The movement held a mix of muscular, revivalistic and social Gospel sensibilities, with work directed to evangelism, Bible study, boys' work, mission, and social service. The organization hosted large revivals and campaigns throughout the US. Some 1.5 million men attended 7,000 events.

Muscular Christianity's popularity declined notably after World War I, when the horrors of the war caused disillusionment with Christianity in general. It appeared to be "mindless strenuosity tied not to social reform but to what cereal king J. H. Kellogg called the new religion 'of being good to yourself'", that is, "such newly accessible leisure-time pursuits as automobiling and listening to the radio."

Muscular Christianity has made a significant impact on evangelicalism in the United States, and through the latter half of the 20th century was promoted by organizations such as the Fellowship of Christian Athletes, Athletes in Action, Promise Keepers, Power Team, and other Christian mixed martial arts (MMA) organizations. It has been suggested by scholars, such as Kristin Kobes Du Mez in her 2020 book Jesus and John Wayne, that Trumpism has elements of Muscular Christianity, with its emphasis on performative masculinity and religiosity.

== Asia ==
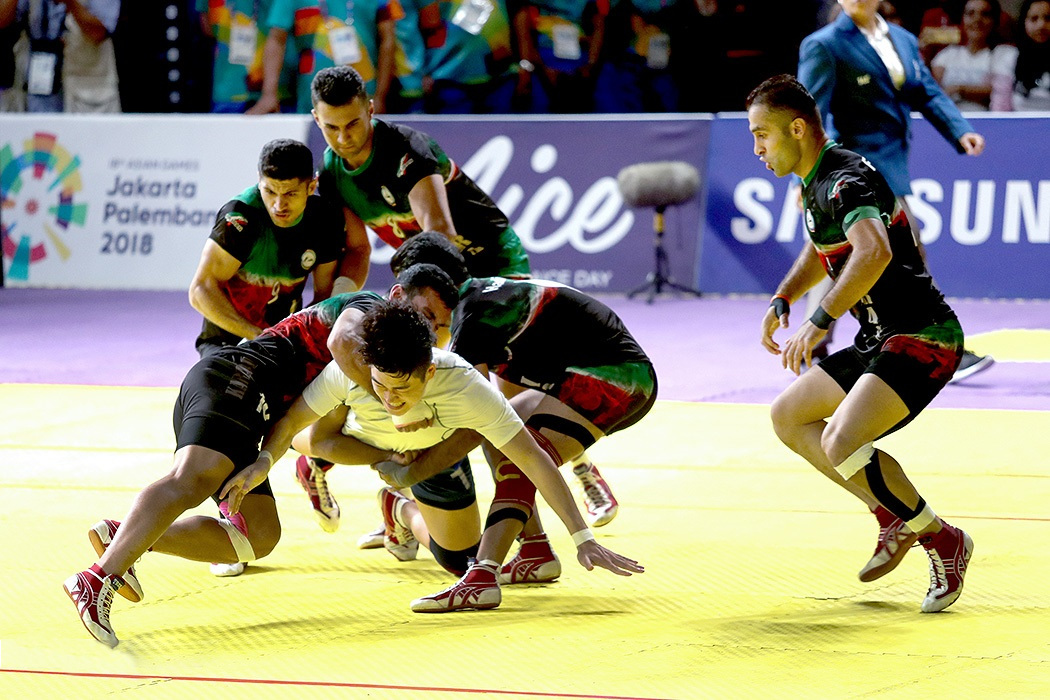
Kabaddi, now played at the Asian Games, was first standardised in British India

Elwood Brown, physical director of the Manila chapter of the YMCA, promoted Muscular Christianity in the Philippines and co-founded the Far Eastern Championship Games which ran from 1914 to 1934. Japanese scholar Ikuo Abe argues that the modern sports ethic and sport culture in Japan was heavily influenced in its infancy by Christian missionaries and Western teachers during the 19th and 20th century. According to Abe, Japan's sport culture developed as a hybridization of Muscular Christianity and Bushido ethics.

=== South Asia ===
Muscular Christianity was also an influence on Swami Vivekananda's ideology of "muscular Hinduism" and Hindu nationalism, particularly his emphasis on physical prowess and masculinity. The North American YMCA also played a role in reshaping Indian physical culture, adopting some of the local sports and assisting in the formation of modern yoga while bringing Western sports to the country.

== Africa ==
According to Peter Alegi, Muscular Christianity reached Africa through colonial mission schools during the late 19th century. Sports were incorporated directly into many mission schools to promote Muscular Christianity, as administrators and missionaries believed sports such as football shared many of the same values. The effect mission schools like Adams College in South Africa had was seen through the demographics of football players, as a significant number of members at the earliest sports clubs in South Africa were Christian Africans. Over time these practices moved away from specific sports and more towards general physical education.

Muscular Christianity became widely noticed throughout Africa due to colonization. Men were meant to be the head of their households, and it was viewed that this structure was deteriorating. It was the establishment of Western-style schools across the continent that brought about Muscular Christianity along with the introduction of European football teams. Soccer was thought to teach young boys self-restraint, fairness, honor, and success. It was also to develop them into disciplined, healthy, and moral citizens. The purpose behind these soccer clubs was not just to bring idealized traits to the young boys, but to make them into strong soldiers and advocates for the Western world. Missionary schools were among the first to incorporate football into their programs, to make sure every student was playing. This was to blend the African and Western culture to transition the African students more easily into the world of Christianity.

Adams College, known as Amanzimtoti Training Institute before 1914, was one of the first and largest missionary schools in southern and central Africa. This school was important due to its football team, the Shooting Stars. This team was successful in competing against other teams throughout the area. Other missionary schools were known more for their success in other sports, like cricket or rugby.

== Impact ==
According to Nicholas Watson, the ideology of Muscular Christianity contributed to the development of the Olympic Games. Pierre de Coubertin, the founder of the modern Olympics, was greatly influenced by Muscular Christianity, and this was one of his primary inspirations alongside the Ancient Olympic Games of Greece.

In the 21st century, there has been a resurgence in the popularity of Muscular Christianity, driven by the disproportionately high number of men becoming atheist or agnostic and by a perceived "crisis of masculinity". In the United States, Muscular Christianity is best represented by athletes such as Tim Tebow, Manny Pacquiao, Josh Hamilton, Christian McCaffrey, Jeremy Lin, and Ilia Topuria. These athletes frequently speak and write about their faith and share their beliefs with their fans.

New Calvinist pastors such as John Piper have pushed for an emphasis on a masculine Christianity and concept of Christ. Piper claims "God revealed Himself in the Bible pervasively as king not queen; father not mother. Second person of the Trinity is revealed as the eternal Son not daughter; the Father and the Son create man and woman in His image and give them the name man, the name of the male." Because of this, Piper further claims that "God has given Christianity a masculine feel."

Michael Kimmel argues in his book Manhood in America that University of Notre Dame showcases Muscular Christianity because the school practices Catholicism. Male athletes on the varsity teams are thought to practice Thomas Hughes's six criteria for Muscular Christianity. Notre Dame's football team, for example, are Catholic men who believe their bodies are a gift from God. Therefore, they train their bodies in the name of God.

A contemporary revival of “muscular Christianity” links physical fitness with Christian faith, appealing to young men seeking discipline and purpose. Social-media platforms such as TikTok and Instagram amplify this aesthetic, circulating short videos that pair strength training with biblical themes. Surveys by the Barna Group, and Pew Research find that Gen Z men increasingly encounter religious content online and report greater interest in church life as a result. Some sociologists and religion scholars attribute part of the recent rise in church attendance among young men to this online movement, noting that figures such as podcast host Joe Rogan, apologist Wes Huff, and psychologist Jordan Peterson often serve as entry points that turn casual exposure into renewed participation in Christian practice.

Reports also note that young men are converting in notable numbers to more “masculine” expressions of Christianity, such as the Eastern and Oriental Orthodox churches and traditionalist branches of Catholicism. While exact figures are difficult to verify, Pew Research Center data indicate that the Orthodox Christian population is now about 64% male, up from 46% in 2007, suggesting a marked demographic shift toward men within these communities.

== See also ==
- Anthony Joseph Drexel Biddle Sr.
- Biblical patriarchy
- Christianity and association football – followers of Muscular Christianity established several of England's leading football teams
- Christian manliness
- Christian nationalism
- Christian vegetarianism
- Dominion theology
- Muscular Judaism
- Muscular Hinduism
- New Testament military metaphors
- Pauline Christianity
- Physical culture
- Positive Christianity
- John Smyth (barrister)
- Sports ministry
