= Iqra Ismail =

English football manager

Iqra Ismail is an English football manager.
