= Follow Follow =

Scottish association football song

"Follow Follow" is a song sung by supporters of Rangers, a football club in Glasgow, Scotland. It is based upon the revivalist hymn "Follow On".

== Club usage ==
The song has been adopted by Rangers as their club anthem. In 2007 Rangers used the song as an inspiration for the title of their initiative against unacceptable behaviour at football matches, Follow With Pride, to replace their Pride Over Prejudice campaign. There is also a Rangers fanzine named after the song. It is also called Follow Follow and was banned from being sold outside Ibrox Stadium due to having printed articles with a sectarian related content. It moved to an online message board which is now the leading Rangers fansite.

== Controversy ==
The song has gathered an amount of controversy after some fans started to sing alternative lyrics about the Pope and the Vatican City that are considered sectarian.

In 1999 Rangers' vice-chairman Donald Findlay had to stand down from his position and resign from the club's board after being filmed singing "Follow Follow" (with these alternative lyrics) and "The Sash". The Faculty of Advocates (the professional body to which Findlay belonged) found his actions were "likely to bring the faculty into disrepute" and fined him £3,500.

== Lyrics ==
The lyrics are:

Though the straits be broad or narrow, then follow we will,
Follow we will, follow we will,
Though the straits be broad or narrow, then follow we will,
We will follow in the footsteps of our team. [God bless them]
Follow follow, we will follow Rangers,
Up the Falls, Derry's Wall,
We will follow on,
Dundee, Hamilton, Celtic Park or Hampden,
If they go to Dublin we will follow on.

For there's not a team like the Glasgow Rangers,
No not one, and there never shall be one,
Celtic know all about their troubles,
We will fight till the day is done.
For there's not a team like the Glasgow Rangers,
No not one, and there never shall be one!
