= Masculinity =

Attributes associated with men

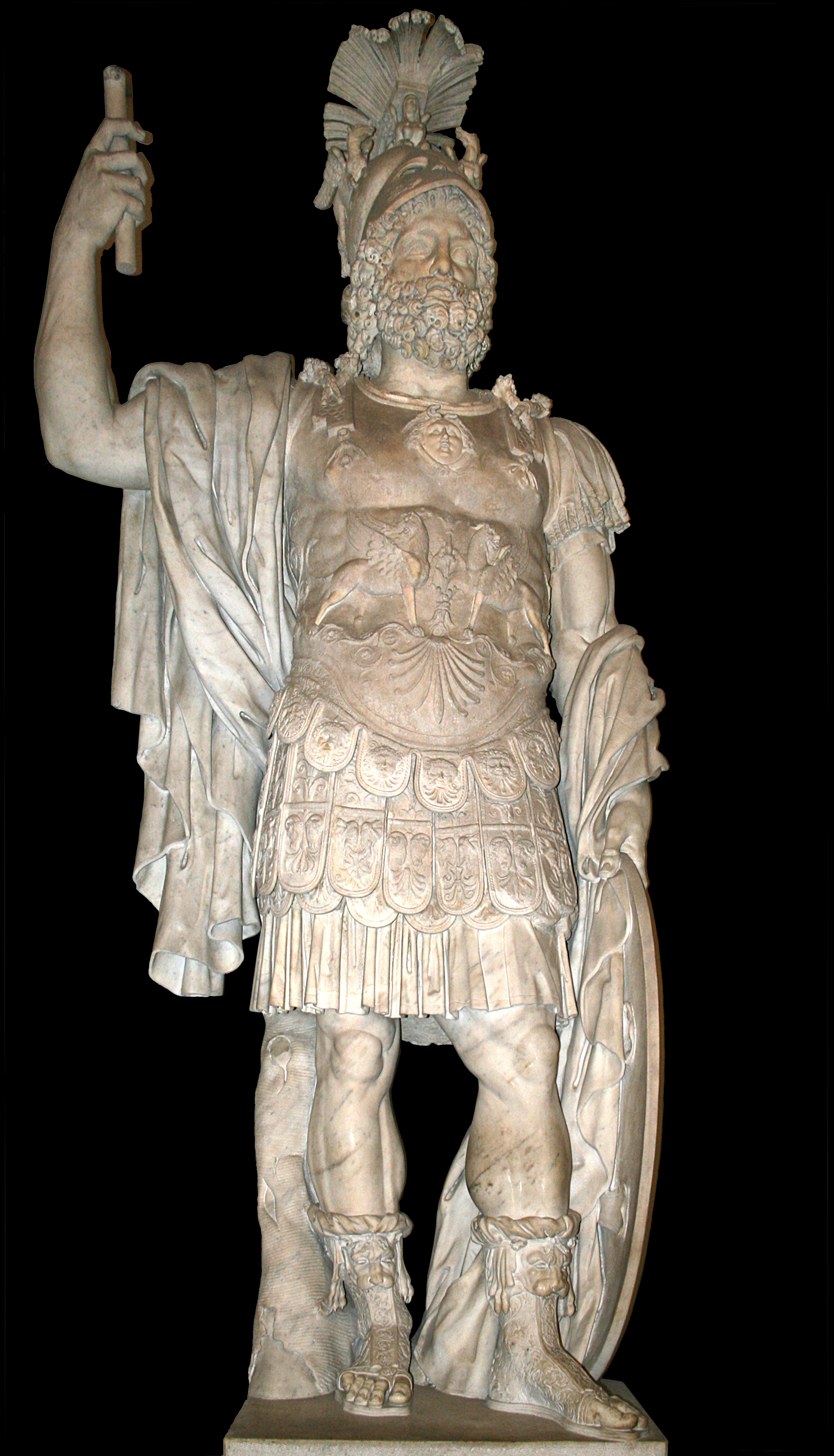
In Roman mythology, Mars was the god of war, an activity associated with masculinity. His female counterpart was Minerva.

Masculinity (also called manliness) is a set of attributes, behaviors, and roles generally associated with men and boys. Masculinity can be understood theoretically as socially constructed, and there is also evidence that some behaviors considered masculine are influenced by both cultural factors and biological factors. To what extent masculinity is biologically or socially influenced is subject to debate. It is distinct from the definition of the biological male sex, as anyone can exhibit masculine traits. Standards of masculinity vary across different cultures and historical periods. In Western cultures, its meaning is traditionally drawn from being contrasted with femininity.

== Overview ==
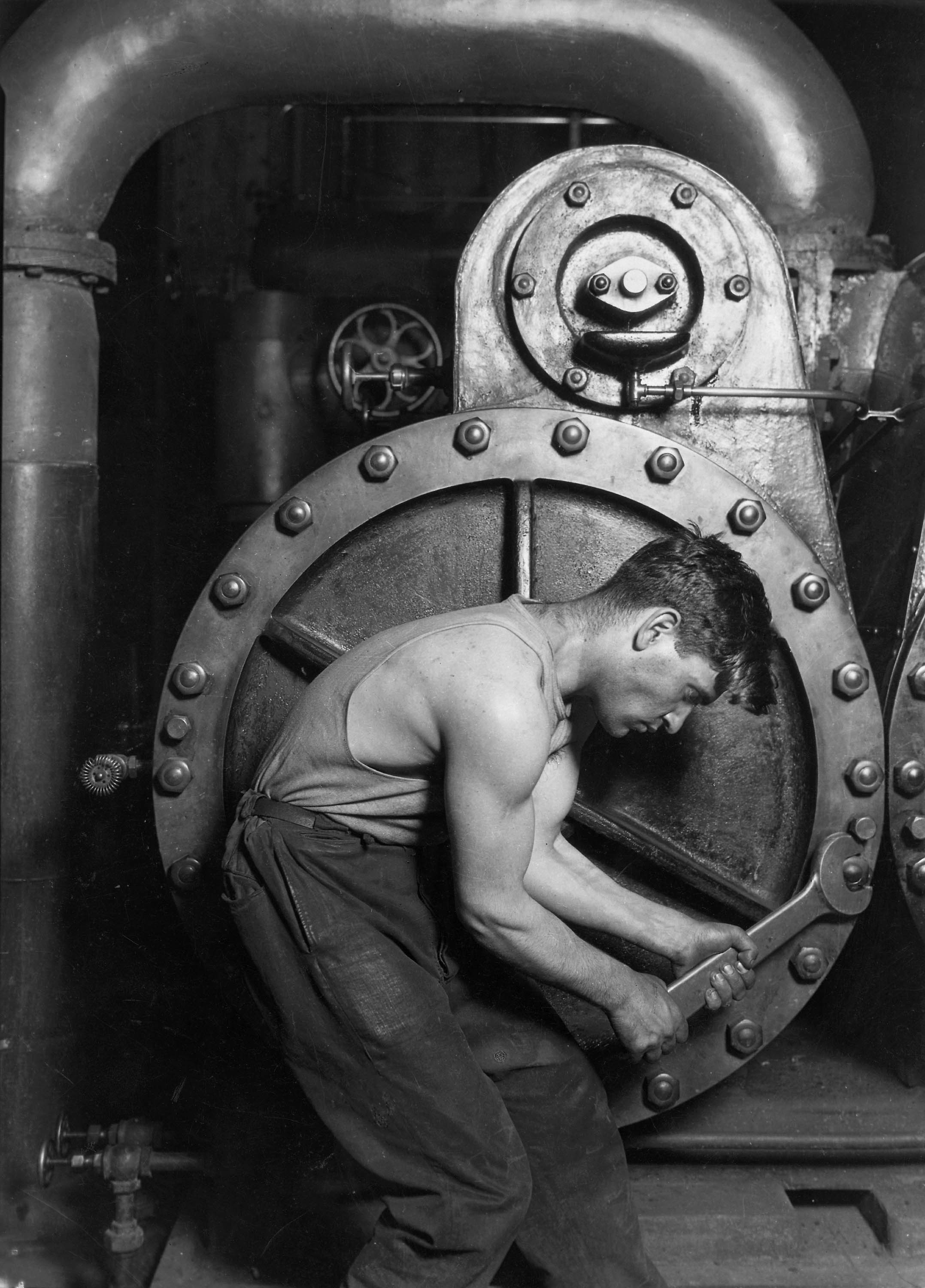
Lewis Hine's photo of a power house mechanic working on a steam pump

Standards of manliness or masculinity vary across different cultures, subcultures, ethnic groups and historical periods. Traits traditionally viewed as masculine in Western society include strength, courage, independence, leadership, dominance, and assertiveness. When women's labor participation increased, there were men who felt less comfortable in their masculinity because it was increasingly difficult for them to reconfirm their status as the breadwinner.

The academic study of masculinity received increased attention during the late 1980s and early 1990s, with the number of courses on the subject in the United States rising from 30 to over 300. This has sparked investigation of the intersection of masculinity with concepts from other fields, such as the social construction of gender difference (prevalent in a number of philosophical and sociological theories).

People regardless of biological sex may exhibit masculine traits and behavior. Those exhibiting both masculine and feminine characteristics are considered androgynous, and feminist philosophers have argued that gender ambiguity may blur gender classification.

== History ==
The concept of masculinity varies historically and culturally. Since what constitutes masculinity has varied by time and place, according to Raewyn Connell, it is more appropriate to discuss "masculinities" than a single overarching concept.

=== Antiquity ===
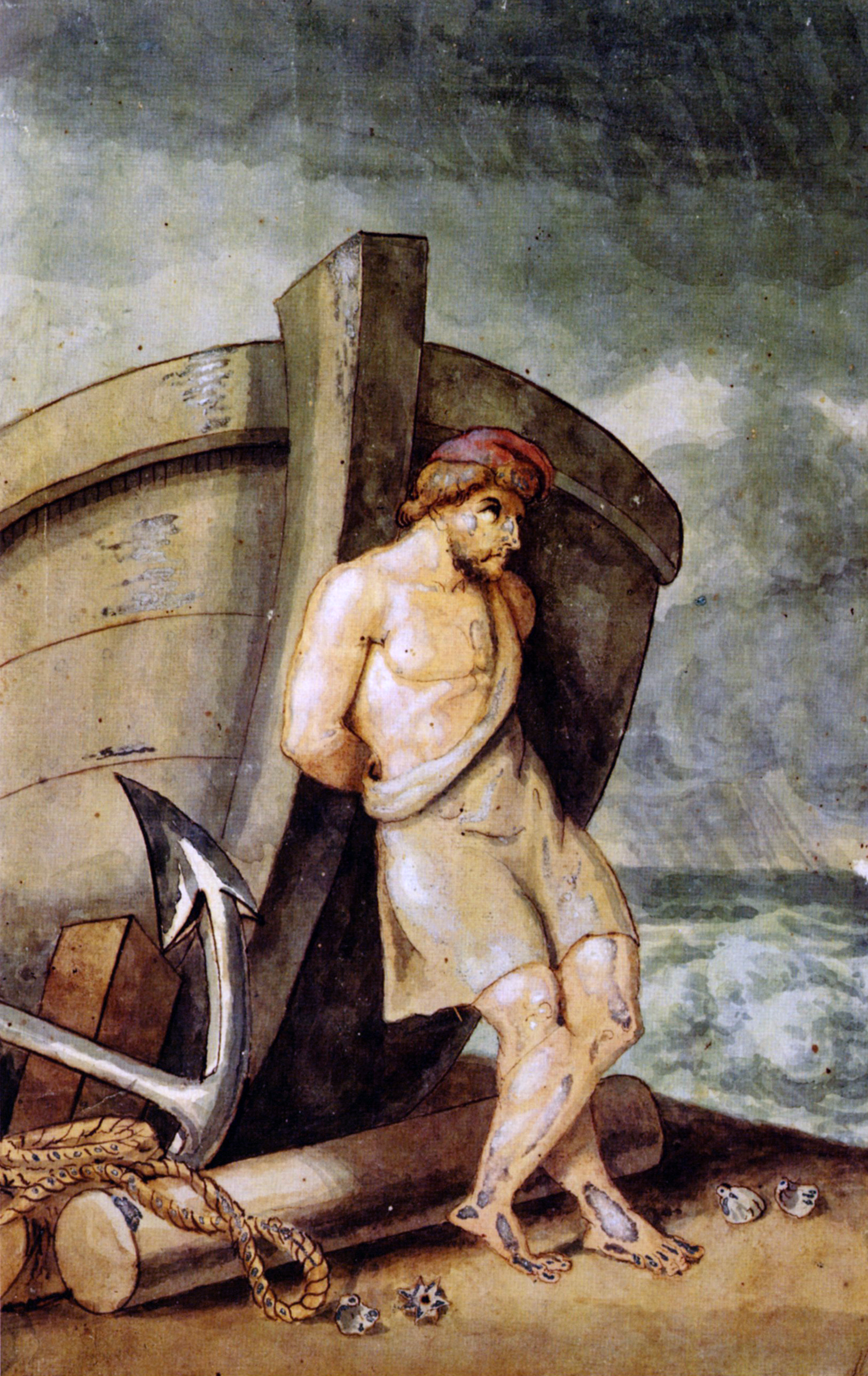
Odysseus, hero of the Odyssey

Ancient literature dates back to about 3000 BC, with explicit expectations for men in the form of laws and implied masculine ideals in myths of gods and heroes. According to the Code of Hammurabi (about 1750 BC):

- Rule 3: "If any one bring an accusation of any crime before the elders, and does not prove what he has charged, he shall, if it be a capital offense charged, be put to death."
- Rule 128: "If a man takes a woman to wife, but has no intercourse with her, this woman is no wife to him."

In the Hebrew Bible of 1000 BC, when King David of Israel drew near to death, he told his son Solomon: "I go the way of all the earth: be thou strong therefore, and shew thyself a man".

In his book Germania (98 AD), Tacitus stated that the men from the ancient Germanic tribes fought aggressively in battle to protect their women from capture by the enemy.

"It stands on record that armies already wavering and on the point of collapse have been rallied by the women, pleading heroically with their men, thrusting forward their bared bosoms, and making them realize the imminent prospect of enslavement – a fate which the Germans fear more desperately for their women than for themselves." -Tacitus (Germania)

In his account of ancient Germany, Tacitus presented the Germanic warrior Arminius as a masculine hero whose already violent nature was further heightened by the abduction of his beloved wife Thusnelda by the Roman general Germanicus. In his rage Arminius demanded war against the Roman empire.

=== Medieval and Victorian eras ===
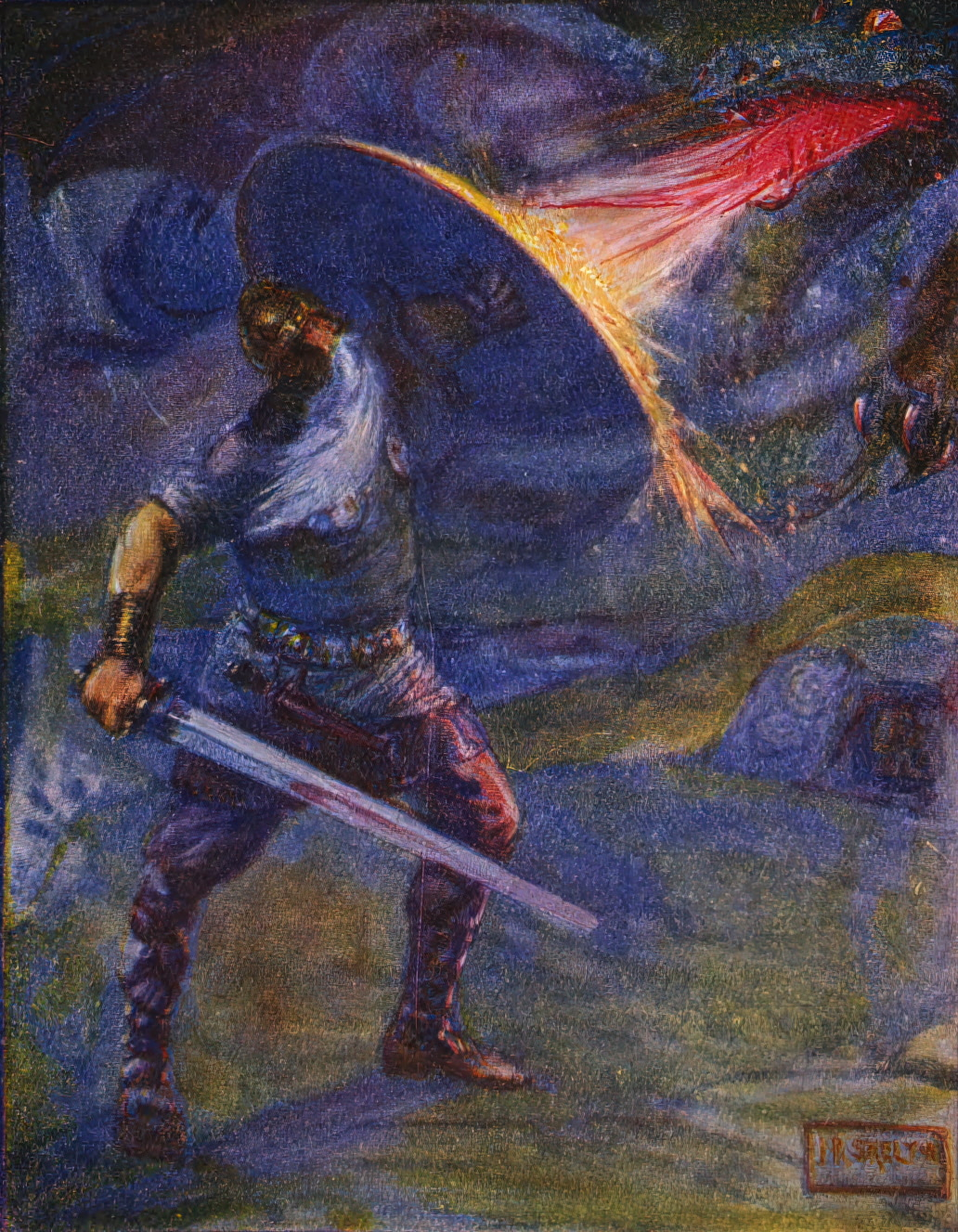
Beowulf fighting the dragon

Jeffrey Richards describes a European "medieval masculinity which was essentially Christian and chivalric," which included concepts like courage, respect for women of all classes and generosity. According to David Rosen, the traditional view of scholars (such as J. R. R. Tolkien) that Beowulf is a tale of medieval heroism overlooks the similarities between Beowulf and the monster Grendel. The masculinity exemplified by Beowulf "cut[s] men off from women, other men, passion and the household".

In Arab culture, Hatim al-Tai is known to be a model of Arab manliness. It is said that he used to give away everything he possessed except for his mount and weapons.

In China, the martial hero occupied a central place in masculine ideals, with military figures celebrated in official history, popular religion, and literature alike. Martial prowess was institutionalized as a masculine ideal through the civil examination system's military counterpart, the wuju (武举), established in 702 CE, which tested candidates in archery, horsemanship, and strength. The veneration of military figures extended into religious life; generals such as Guan Yu were posthumously deified, his temples spreading across China from the Song dynasty onward. His composure while a surgeon scraped poison from his bone without anesthesia became an enduring archetype of masculine indifference to physical suffering. The monk Lu Zhishen, who uproots a willow tree bare-handed in Water Margin, represented a related ideal of masculine physical transcendence.

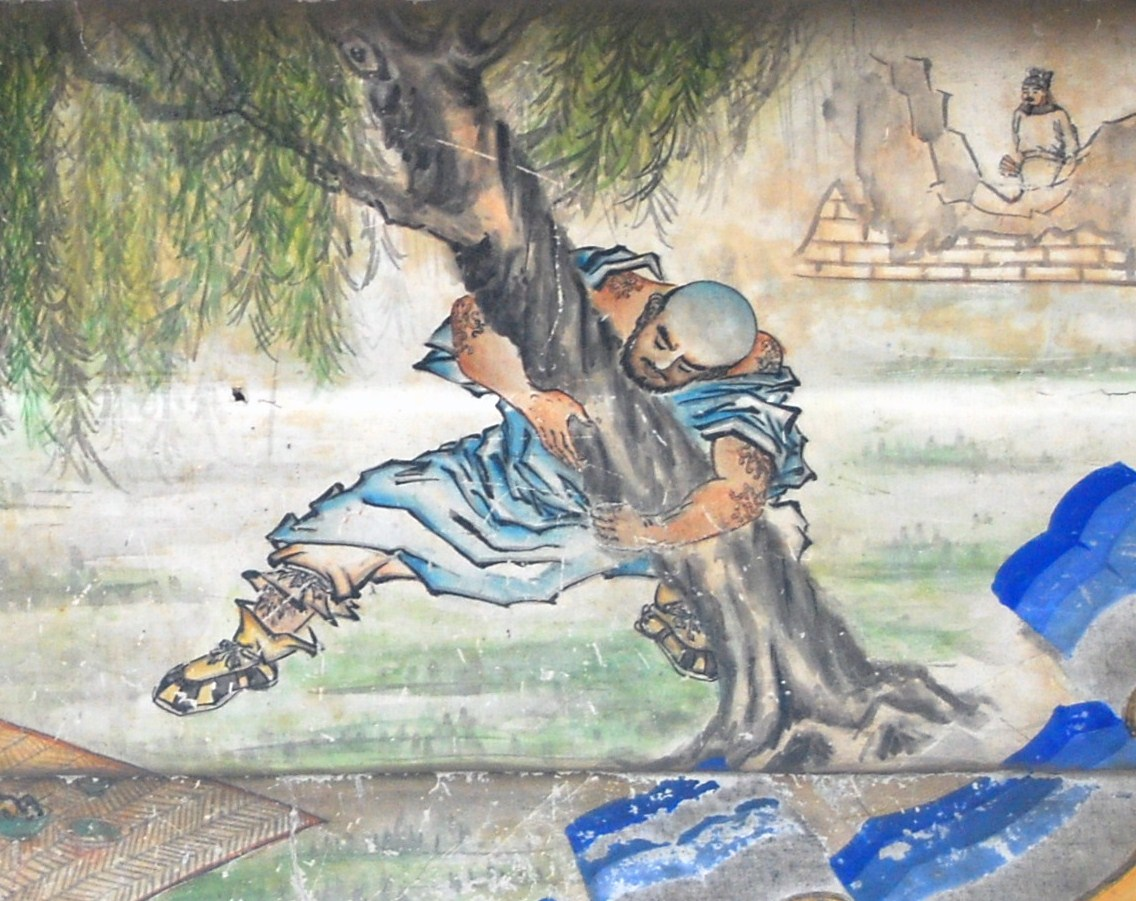
Lu Zhishen uproots a willow tree.

In Japan, the bushido code demanded that a warrior choose death over dishonor, while sumo wrestling, formalized as a court ritual during the Nara period (710–794), located masculine virtue in physical dominance and ritual purity.

In Korea, the hwarang of the Silla dynasty were trained in martial arts, poetry, and music, their code recorded in the Samguk Yusa as: "be loyal to your lord, be obedient to your parents, have trust among friends, never retreat in battle, and never kill indiscriminately."

During the Victorian era, masculinity underwent a transformation from traditional heroism. Scottish philosopher Thomas Carlyle wrote in 1831: "The old ideal of Manhood has grown obsolete, and the new is still invisible to us, and we grope after it in darkness, one clutching this phantom, another that; Werterism, Byronism, even Brummelism, each has its day".

Boxing was professionalized in America and Europe in the 19th century; it emphasized the physical and confrontational aspects of masculinity. Bare-knuckle boxing without gloves represented "the manly art" in 19th-century America.

=== 20th century to present ===
In 1963, social theorist Erving Goffman's seminal work on stigma management presented a list of traits prescribed as categorically masculine for American men:

In an important sense there is only one complete unblushing male in America: a young, married, white, urban, northern, heterosexual Protestant father of college education, fully employed, of good complexion, weight and height, and a recent record in sports.^{:128}

Writing in 1974, R. Gould asserted that the provider role was central to adult men's identities, as masculinity is often measured by the size of a man's economic contribution to the family. Masculinity is also associated with denying characteristics associated with women. Overwhelmingly, the construction of masculinity most valued in the latter part of the 20th century and the early 21st century is one that is independent, sexually assertive, and athletic, among other normative markers of manhood. There is some evidence of this construction developing slightly however. A 2008 study showed that men frequently rank good health, a harmonious family life and a good relationship with their spouse or partner as more important to their quality of life than physical attractiveness and success with women. The advent of social media has been associated with the ability to form emotional and supportive relationships with others.

== Development ==
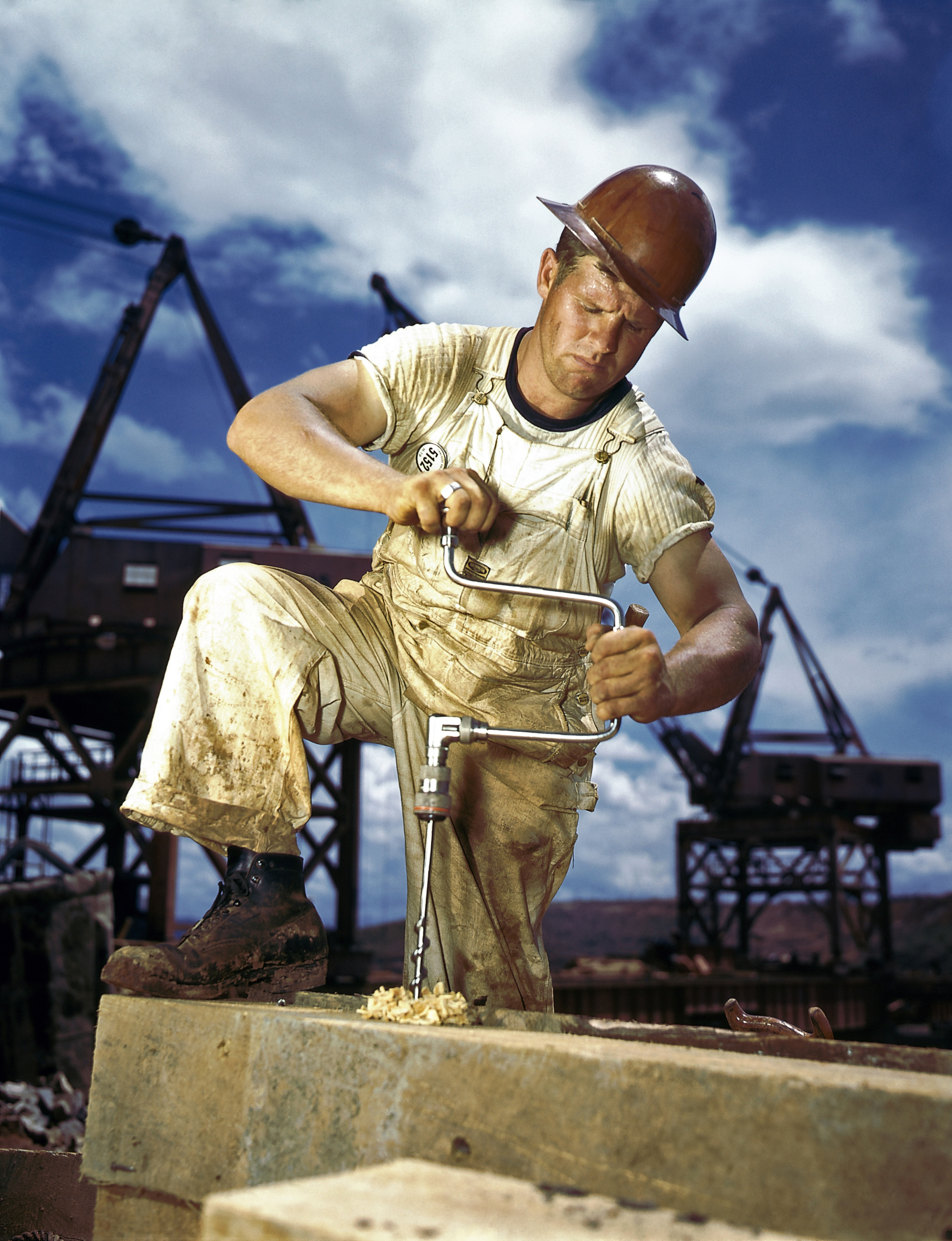
An early color photograph of a construction worker

=== Nature versus nurture ===
Scholars have debated the extent to which gender identity and gender-specific behaviors are due to socialization versus biological factors. Social and biological influences are thought to be mutually interacting during development. Studies of prenatal androgen exposure have provided some evidence that femininity and masculinity are partly biologically determined. Other possible biological influences include evolution, genetics, epigenetics, and hormones (both during development and in adulthood). Scholars suggest that innate differences between the sexes are compounded or exaggerated by the influences of social factors. However, others have pointed to the fact that personality differences between the sexes are seen to increase with increased levels of egalitarianism.

=== Social construction of masculinity ===
Across cultures, characteristics of masculinity are similar in essence but varying in detail, another shared pattern is that non-typical behavior of one's sex or gender may be viewed as a social problem. In sociology, this labeling is known as gender assumptions and is part of socialization to meet the mores of a society. Non-standard behavior may be considered indicative of homosexuality, despite the fact that gender expression, gender identity and sexual orientation are widely accepted as distinct concepts. When sexuality is defined in terms of object choice (as in early sexology studies), male homosexuality may be interpreted as effeminacy. Machismo is a form of masculinity that emphasizes power and is often associated with a disregard for consequences and responsibility.

Some believe that masculinity is linked to the male body; in this view, masculinity is associated with male genitalia. Others have suggested that although masculinity may be influenced by biology, it is also a cultural construct. Many aspects of masculinity assumed to be natural are linguistically and culturally driven. Males were more likely to be depicted in a less humorous way in the evening as opposed to the daytime, whereas females were more likely to be rated in a less humorous way in the daytime as opposed to the evening. Reeser argues that although the military has a vested interest in constructing and promoting a specific form of masculinity, it does not create it. Facial hair is linked to masculinity through language, in stories about boys becoming men when they begin to shave.

Some social scientists conceptualize masculinity (and femininity) as a performance. Gender performances may not necessarily be intentional and people may not even be aware of the extent to which they are performing gender, as one outcome of lifelong gender socialization is the feeling that one's gender is "natural" or biologically ordained.

Masculine performance varies over the life course, but also from one context to another. For instance, the sports world may elicit more traditionally normative masculinities in participants than would other settings. Men who exhibit a tough and aggressive masculinity on the sports field may display a softer masculinity in familial contexts. Masculinities vary by social class as well. Studies suggest working class constructions of masculinity to be more normative than are those from middle class men and boys. As these contexts and comparisons illustrate, theorists suggest a multiplicity of masculinities, not simply one single construction of masculinity.

Historian Kate Cooper wrote: "Wherever a woman is mentioned a man's character is being judged – and along with it what he stands for." Scholars cite integrity and equality as masculine values in male-male relationships.

==== Gay and lesbian people ====
Gay men are considered by some to be "effeminate and deviate from the masculine norm" and are sometimes benevolently stereotyped as "gentle and refined", even by other gay men. According to gay human-rights campaigner Peter Tatchell:

Contrary to the well-intentioned claim that gays are "just the same" as straights, there is a difference. What is more, the distinctive style of gay masculinity is of great social benefit. Wouldn't life be dull without the flair and imagination of queer fashion designers and interior decorators? How could the NHS cope with no gay nurses, or the education system with no gay teachers? Society should thank its lucky stars that not all men turn out straight, macho and insensitive. The different hetero and homo modes of maleness are not, of course, biologically fixed.

Psychologist Joseph Pleck argues that a hierarchy of masculinity exists largely as a dichotomy of homosexual and heterosexual males: "Our society uses the male heterosexual-homosexual dichotomy as a central symbol for all the rankings of masculinity, for the division on any grounds between males who are "real men" and have power, and males who are not". Michael Kimmel adds that the trope "You're so gay" indicates a lack of masculinity, rather than homosexual orientation. According to Pleck, to avoid male oppression of women, themselves and other men, patriarchal structures, institutions and discourse must be eliminated from Western society.

In the documentary The Butch Factor, gay men (one of them transgender) were asked about their views of masculinity. Masculine traits were generally seen as an advantage in and out of the closet, allowing "butch" gay men to conceal their sexual orientation longer while engaged in masculine activities such as sports. Some did not see themselves as effeminate, and felt little connection to gay culture. Some effeminate gay men in The Butch Factor felt uncomfortable about their femininity (despite being comfortable with their sexuality), and feminine gay men may be derided by stereotypically masculine gays.

Feminine-looking men tended to come out earlier after being labeled gay by their peers. More likely to face bullying and harassment throughout their lives, they are taunted by derogatory words (such as "sissy") implying feminine qualities. Effeminate, "campy" gay men sometimes use what John R. Ballew called "camp humor", such as referring to one another by female pronouns (according to Ballew, "a funny way of defusing hate directed toward us [gay men]"); however, such humor "can cause us [gay men] to become confused in relation to how we feel about being men". He further stated:

[Heterosexual] men are sometimes advised to get in touch with their "inner feminine." Maybe gay men need to get in touch with their "inner masculine" instead. Identifying those aspects of being a man we most value and then cultivate those parts of our selves can lead to a healthier and less distorted sense of our own masculinity.

A study by the Center for Theoretical Study at Charles University in Prague and the Academy of Sciences of the Czech Republic found significant differences in shape among the faces of 66 heterosexual and gay men, with gay men having more stereotypically masculine features ("undermin[ing] stereotypical notions of gay men as more feminine looking.") However, other studies with larger sample sizes have found that homosexual men were seen as "significantly more feminine and less masculine" than those of heterosexual men Furthermore, a 2017 study utilized neural networks to see whether artificial intelligence would be able to differentiate accurately between more than 35,000 images of gay and straight faces. The results showed that the "classifier could correctly distinguish between gay and heterosexual men in 81% of cases, and in 71% of cases for women." Supporting the idea that men's faces are perceived as more feminine, analysis suggests that gay men have more "gender-atypical facial morphology, expression and grooming styles".

Gay men have been presented in the media as feminine and open to ridicule, although films such as Brokeback Mountain are countering the stereotype. A recent development is the portrayal of gay men in the LGBT community as "bears", a subculture of gay men celebrating rugged masculinity and "secondary sexual characteristics of the male: facial hair, body hair, proportional size, baldness".

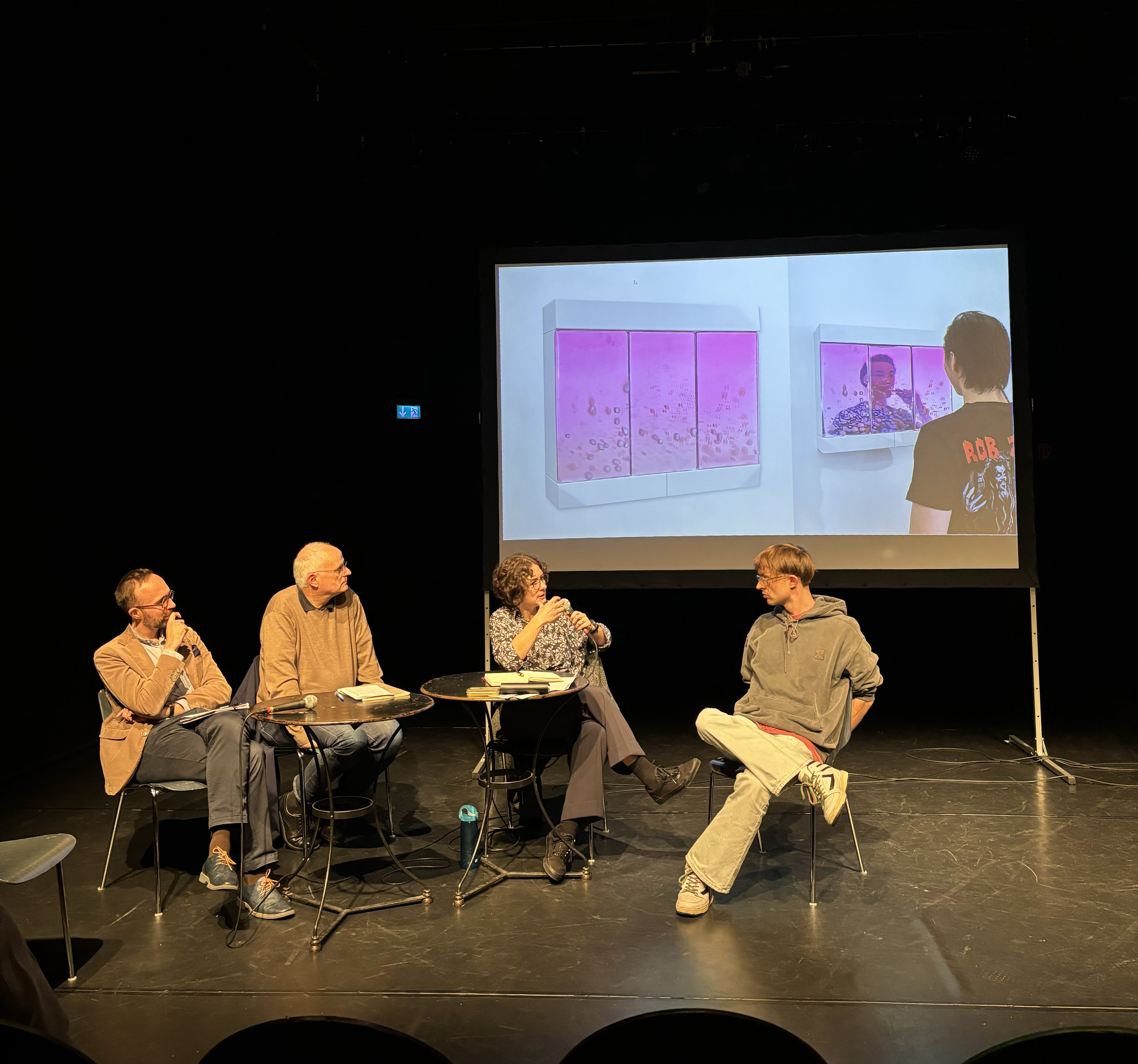
Discussions about post-heroic masculinities with Andreas Plackinger, Ulrich Bröckling, Rebecca Heinrich and Thomas Liu Le Lann at E-Werk Freiburg, Germany, 2024

In the Soft Heroes series, French artist Thomas Liu Le Lann questions concepts of post-heroic masculinity. These fabric figures refer to transhuman bodies beyond heteronormativity and question conventional notions of strength and agency. The Austrian literary scientist Rebecca Heinrich, her research interests include homosexuality and masculinities in the literary discourse of the 20th and 21st centuries, HIV/AIDS as a theme and motif, hero narratives, literary mediation, performative poetry and literature in the Anthropocene, describes the Soft Heroes as "es", as the trans-human beings are on the edge of formlessness and refuse to be assigned a gender.

Second-wave pro-feminism paid greater attention to issues of sexuality, particularly the relationship between homosexual men and hegemonic masculinity. This shift led to increased cooperation between the men's liberation and gay liberation movements developing, in part, because masculinity was understood as a social construct and in response to the universalization of "men" in previous men's movements. Men's rights activists worked to stop second-wave feminists from influencing the gay-rights movement, promoting hypermasculinity as inherent to gay sexuality.

Masculinity has played an important role in lesbian culture, although lesbians vary widely in the degree to which they express masculinity and femininity. In LGBT cultures, masculine women are often referred to as "butch".

==== Hegemonic masculinity ====
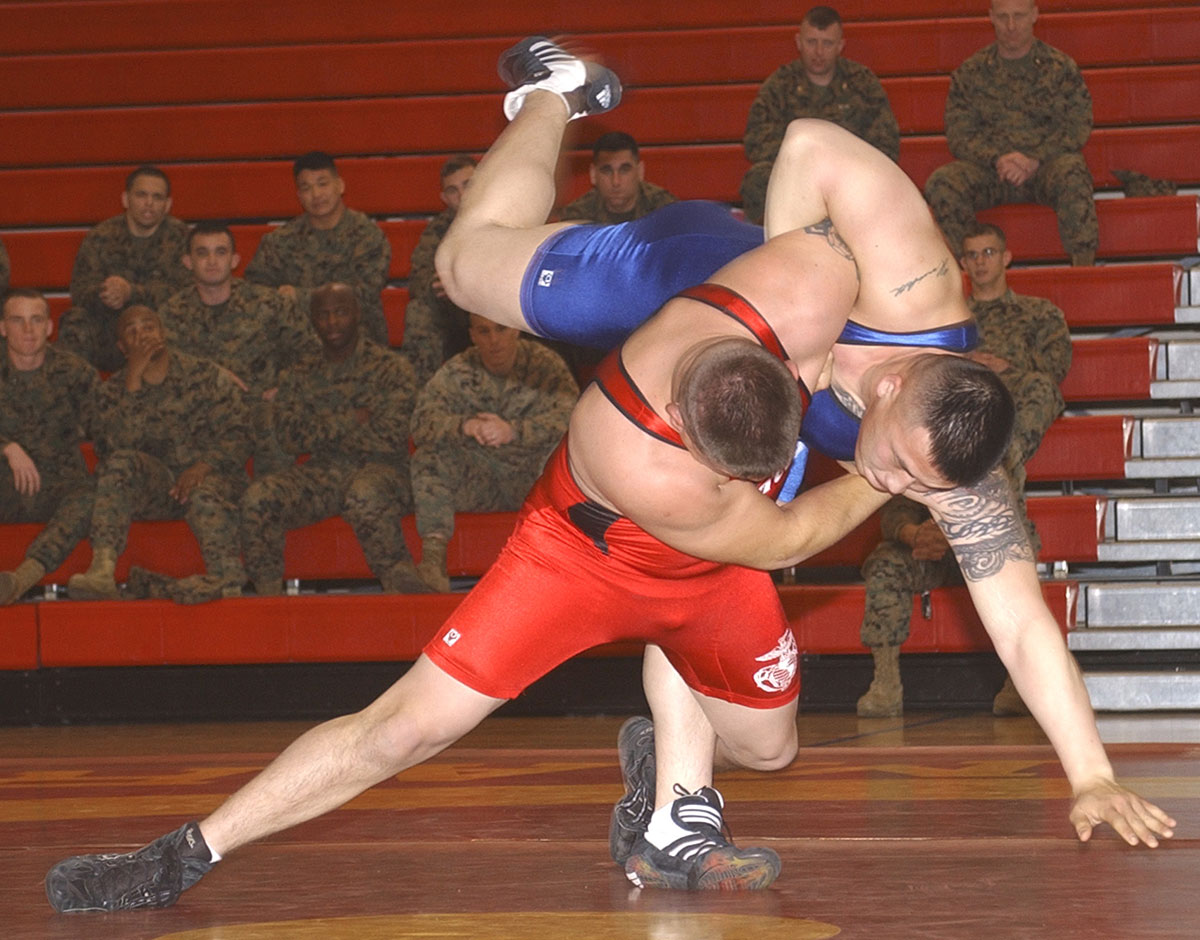
Contests of physical skill and strength appear in some form in many cultures. Here, two U.S. Marines compete in a wrestling match.

Traditional avenues for men to gain honor were providing for their families and exercising leadership. Raewyn Connell has labeled traditional male roles and privileges hegemonic masculinity, encouraged in men and discouraged in women: "Hegemonic masculinity can be defined as the configuration of gender practice which embodies the currently accepted answer to the problem of the legitimacy of patriarchy, which guarantees the dominant position of men and the subordination of women". Connell (1987) placed emphasis on heterosexuality and its influence on the construction of gender. From this perspective, there is a dominant (hegemonic) and idealized form of masculinity in every social system and an apotheosized form of femininity that is considered proper for men and women. This idealized form of masculinity (hegemonic masculinity) legitimates and normalizes certain performances of men, and pathologizes, marginalizes, and subordinates any other expressions of masculinities or femininities (masculine and feminine subject positions). Alongside hegemonic masculinity, Connell postulated that there are other forms of masculinities (marginalized and subordinated), which, according to a plethora of studies, are constructed in oppressive ways (Thorne 1993). This is symptomatic of the fact that hegemonic masculinity is relational, which means that it is constructed in relation to and against an Other (emphasized femininity, marginalized and subordinated masculinities). In addition to describing forceful articulations of violent masculine identities, hegemonic masculinity has also been used to describe implicit, indirect, or coercive forms of gendered socialization, enacted through video games, fashion, humor, and so on.

==== Precarious manhood ====
Researchers have argued that the "precariousness" of manhood contributes to traditionally masculine behavior. "Precarious" means that manhood is not inborn, but must be achieved. In many cultures, boys endure painful initiation rituals to become men. Manhood may also be lost, as when a man is derided for not "being a man". Researchers have found that men respond to threats to their manhood by engaging in stereotypically masculine behaviors and beliefs, such as supporting hierarchy, espousing homophobic beliefs, supporting aggression and choosing physical tasks over intellectual ones.

In 2014, Winegard and Geary wrote that the precariousness of manhood involves social status (prestige or dominance), and manhood may be more (or less) precarious due to the avenues men have for achieving status.

== In intersex people ==
Intersex people may also express masculine traits and behaviors. Those who were originally assigned 'female' and raised as 'girls', but live in their affirmed gender as men may navigate masculinity with a wide variety of experiences related to their bodies, identities, and lives.

== In transgender people ==
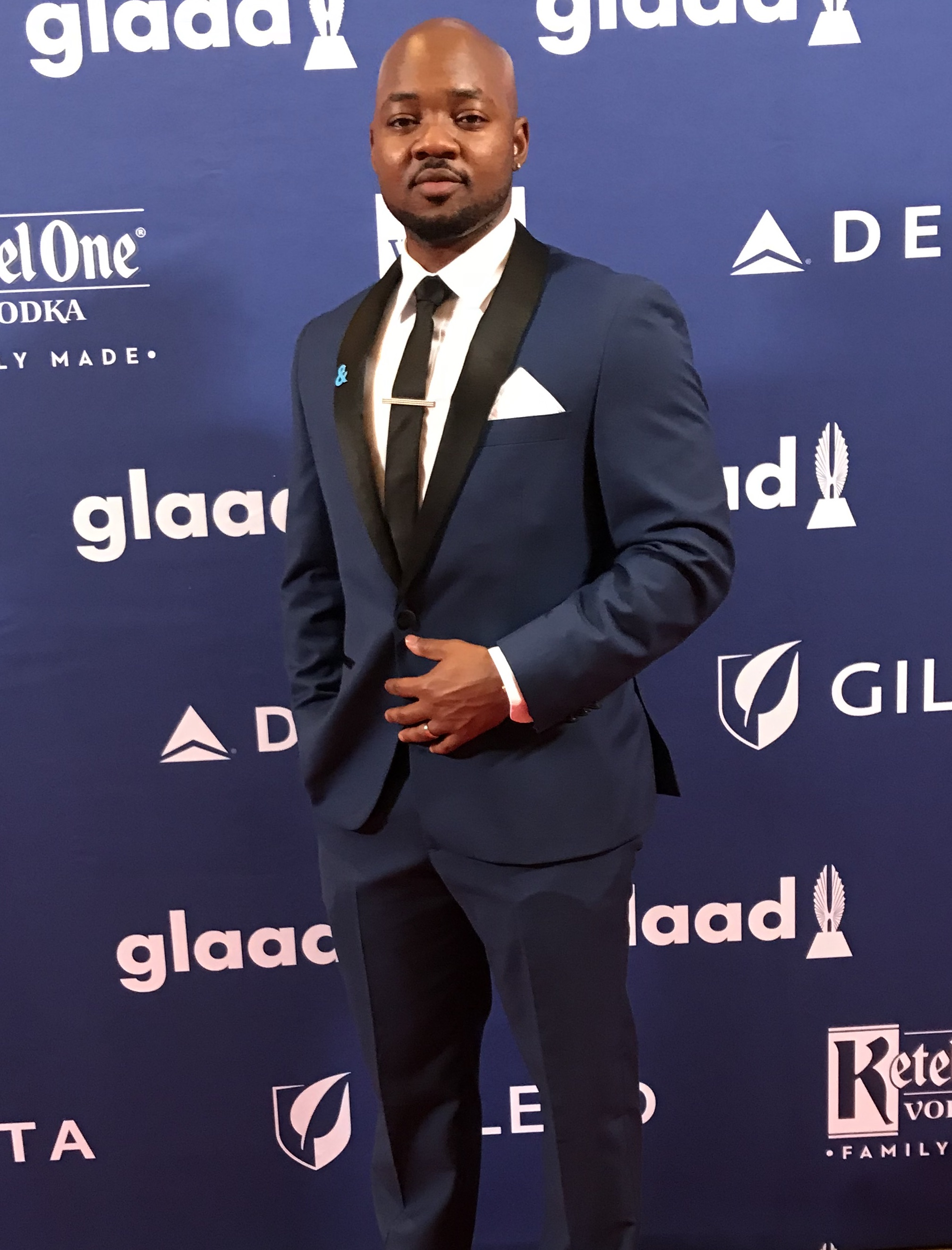
Photo of Brian Michael Smith at 2018 GLAAD Media Awards in NYC

Transgender people negotiate masculinity in multiple ways.

Trans men share many of the varied experiences of men as a group, but their lives are often informed accordingly to the extent they were socialized as women in their early lives. One study in Italy showed that transmasculine individuals have greater emotional control and self-reliance than cisgender men, while cisgender men showed higher affinity for heterosexual self-presentation and endorsement of power over women. Harmful health behaviors such as alcohol and tobacco use may feature in early transition for some trans men in order to access masculinity, but as they are increasingly affirmed in their gender, their reliance on these mechanisms often decreases. Trans men may experience masculinity alongside changes in their perceptions of safety that affect their interactions with other men. When feeling less safe in interactions, they may practice "defensive masculinities" to avoid perceived threats of violence and protect themselves or others. When they feel a sense of respect from other men, they may use "transformative masculinities" to challenge the gender system. Trans men's experiences with masculinity vary widely by culture and setting.

All transgender people may experience aggression and violence from others due to "masculinity threat," defined as "any experience that causes the self or others to question one's status as a 'real man'." When men experience masculinity threat, they may demonstrate aggression toward and derogation of transgender people to "demonstrate how masculine they are themselves."

== In women ==
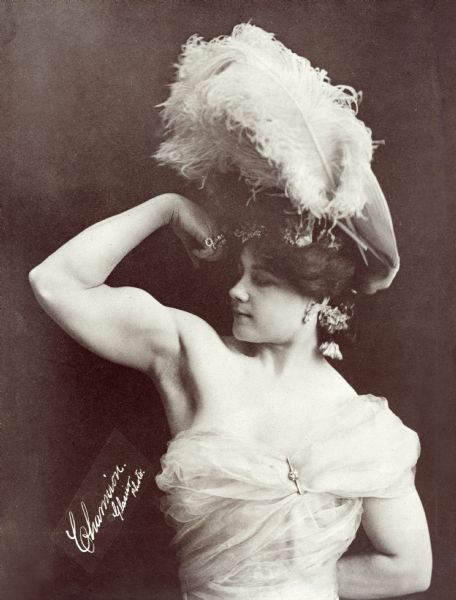
Vaudeville trapeze artist and strongwoman, Charmion

Although often ignored in discussions of masculinity, women can also express masculine traits and behaviors. In Western culture, female masculinity has been codified into identities such as "tomboy" and "butch". Although female masculinity is often associated with lesbianism, expressing masculinity is not necessarily related to a woman's sexuality. In feminist philosophy, female masculinity is often characterized as a type of gender performance which challenges traditional masculinity and male dominance. Zachary A. Kramer argues that the discussion of masculinity should be opened up "to include constructions of masculinity that uniquely affect women." Masculine women are often subject to social stigma and harassment, although the influence of the feminist movement has led to greater acceptance of women expressing masculinity in recent decades.

Cover of Qin Liangyu, edited by Tan Zhengbi. National Library of China.

Historical examples of women expressing masculine traits through physical prowess and military command exist across cultures. In imperial China, Qin Liangyu (1574–1648) was recorded in the Mingshi (History of Ming) as proficient in archery, horsemanship, and spear-fighting. She designed and trained the White Pole Army, an elite infantry force named for their distinctive white waxwood spears, adapted for mountain warfare with a hook for slashing and a metal ring for striking, and capable of being linked together as climbing ladders. She commanded this force in over thirty campaigns against both internal rebellions and Manchu invasion forces, continuing to lead troops in the field past the age of sixty. The Chongzhen Emperor, upon receiving her in Beijing, presented her with four personal poems and reportedly lamented the absence of a single male general with comparable valor. Qin remains the only woman in the Twenty-Four Histories whose biography was placed among those of generals and ministers rather than in the separate "Biographies of Exemplary Women."

Women who participate in sports, especially male-dominated sports, are sometimes derided as being masculine. Even though most sports emphasize stereotypically masculine qualities, such as strength, competition, and aggression, women who participate in sports are still expected to conform to strictly feminine gender norms. This is known as the "female athlete paradox". Although traditional gender norms are gradually changing, female athletes, especially those that participate in male-dominated sports such as boxing, weight lifting, American football, rugby, ice hockey, and motorsport, are still often viewed as deviating from the boundaries of femininity and may suffer negative repercussions.

Women face a similar paradox in the business world, as corporate leadership roles are widely associated with stereotypically masculine characteristics. Women who adopt these characteristics may be more successful, but also more disliked due to not conforming with expected feminine stereotypes. According to a study in the UK, women with stereotypically masculine personality traits are more likely to gain access to high-paying occupations than women with feminine personality traits. According to another study conducted in Germany, women who fit the stereotypical masculine gender role are generally more successful in their careers.

== Health ==
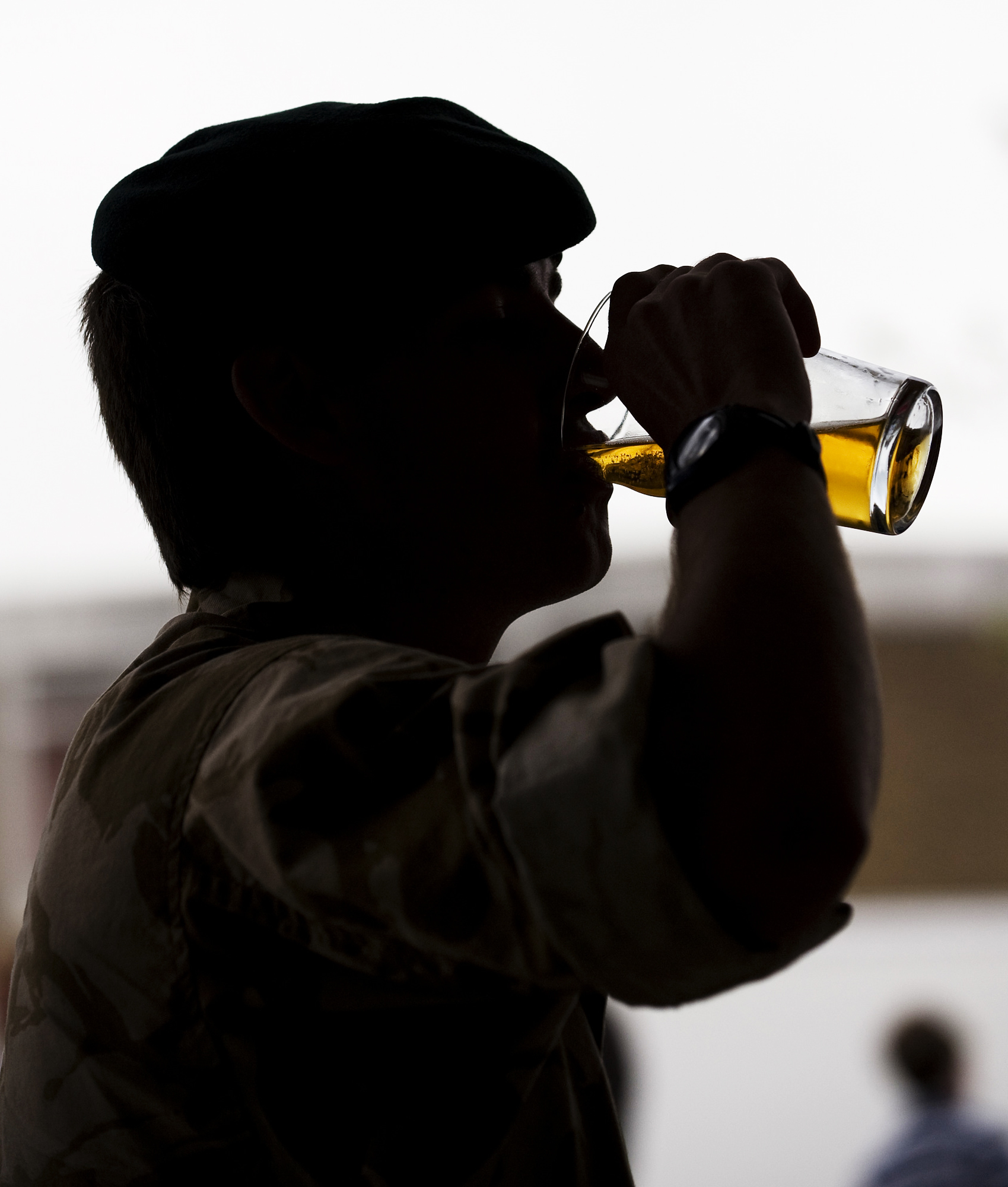
A British soldier drinks a pint glass of beer after his return from Afghanistan. Fighting in wars and drinking alcohol are both traditionally masculine activities in many cultures.

Evidence points to the negative impact of hegemonic masculinity on men's health-related behavior, with American men making 134.5 million fewer physician visits per year than women. Twenty-five percent of men aged 45 to 60 do not have a personal physician, increasing their risk of death from heart disease. Men between 25 and 65 are four times more likely to die from cardiovascular disease than women, and are more likely to be diagnosed with a terminal illness because of their reluctance to see a doctor. Reasons cited for not seeing a physician include fear, denial, embarrassment, a dislike of situations out of their control and the belief that visiting a doctor is not worth the time or cost.

Studies of men in North America and Europe show that men who consume alcoholic drinks often do so in order to fulfill certain social expectations of manliness. While the causes of drinking and alcoholism are complex and varied, gender roles and social expectations have a strong influence encouraging men to drink.

In 2004, Arran Stibbe published an analysis of a well-known men's-health magazine in 2000. According to Stibbe, although the magazine ostensibly focused on health it also promoted traditional masculine behaviors such as excessive consumption of convenience foods and meat, alcohol consumption and unsafe sex. Masculinity and sexual health is also a complex issue in the Global South, as well. In South Africa, HIV transmission was one of the significant reasons for the development of masculinities research. Risky actions commonly representative of toxic masculinity are also present in Western and Chinese male clients' attitudes and behaviors toward female sex workers in China's commercial sex industry. While many male clients frequently exhibited physical violence toward the female workers, in order to more overtly display their manliness, some men also admitted to being more sexually aggressive at times and purposefully having unprotected sex without the worker's knowledge.

Research on beer-commercial content by Lance Strate yielded results relevant to a study of masculinity. In beer commercials, masculine behavior (especially risk-taking) is encouraged. Commercials often focus on situations in which a man overcomes an obstacle in a group, working or playing hard (construction workers, farm workers or cowboys). Those involving play have central themes of mastery (of nature or each other), risk and adventure: fishing, camping, playing sports or socializing in bars. There is usually an element of danger and a focus on movement and speed (watching fast cars or driving fast). The bar is a setting for the measurement of masculinity in skills such as billiards, strength, and drinking ability.

Men, boys and people who were assigned male at birth face gender policing from people who think they are not masculine enough. Gender policing can increase the risk of alcoholism, anxiety, and depression.

== Criticism ==
Study of the history of masculinity emerged during the 1980s, aided by the fields of women's and (later) gender history. Before women's history was examined, there was a "strict gendering of the public/private divide"; regarding masculinity, this meant little study of how men related to the household, domesticity and family life. Although women's historical role was negated, despite the writing of history by (and primarily about) men, a significant portion of the male experience was missing. This void was questioned during the late 1970s, when women's history began to analyze gender and women. Joan Scott's seminal article, calling for gender studies as an analytical concept to explore society, power and discourse, laid the foundation for this field.

According to Scott, gender should be used in two ways: productive and produced. Productive gender examined its role in creating power relationships, and produced gender explored the use and change of gender throughout history. This has influenced the field of masculinity, as seen in Pierre Bourdieu's definition of masculinity: produced by society and culture, and reproduced in daily life. A flurry of work in women's history led to a call for study of the male role (initially influenced by psychoanalysis) in society and emotional and interpersonal life. Connell wrote that these initial works were marked by a "high level of generality" in "broad surveys of cultural norms". The scholarship was aware of contemporary societal changes aiming to understand and evolve (or liberate) the male role in response to feminism.John Tosh calls for a return to this aim for the history of masculinity to be useful, academically and in the public sphere.

Two concerns over the study of the history of masculinity are that it would stabilize the historical process (rather than change it) and that a cultural overemphasis on the approach to masculinity lacks the reality of actual experience. According to John Tosh, masculinity has become a conceptual framework used by historians to enhance their cultural explorations instead of a specialty in its own right. This draws attention from reality to representation and meaning, not only in the realm of masculinity; culture was becoming "the bottom line, the real historical reality". Tosh critiques Martin Francis' work in this light because popular culture, rather than the experience of family life, is the basis for Francis' argument. Francis uses contemporary literature and film to demonstrate that masculinity was restless, shying away from domesticity and commitment, during the late 1940s and 1950s. Francis wrote that this flight from commitment was "most likely to take place at the level of fantasy (individual and collective)". In focusing on culture, it is difficult to gauge the degree to which films such as Scott of the Antarctic represented the era's masculine fantasies. Michael Roper's call to focus on the subjectivity of masculinity addresses this cultural bias, because broad understanding is set aside for an examination "of what the relationship of the codes of masculinity is to actual men, to existential matters, to persons and to their psychic make-up" (Tosh's human experience).

According to Tosh, the culture of masculinity has outlived its usefulness because it cannot fulfill the initial aim of this history (to discover how manhood was conditioned and experienced) and he urged "questions of behaviour and agency". His work on Victorian masculinity uses individual experience in letters and sketches to illustrate broader cultural and social customs, such as birthing or Christmas traditions.

Stefan Dudink believes that the methodological approach (trying to categorize masculinity as a phenomenon) undermined its historiographic development. Abigail Solomou-Godeau's work on post-revolutionary French art addresses a strong, constant patriarchy.

Tosh's overall assessment is that a shift is needed in conceptualizing the topic back to the history of masculinity as a speciality aiming to reach a broader audience, rather than as an analytical tool of cultural and social history. The importance he places on public history hearkens back to the initial aims of gender history, which sought to use history to enlighten and change the present. Tosh appeals to historians to live up to the "social expectation" of their work, which would also require a greater focus on subjectivity and masculinity. This view is contrary to Dudink's; the latter called for an "outflanking movement" towards the history of masculinity, in response to the errors he perceived in the study. This would do the opposite of what Tosh called for, deconstructing masculinity by not placing it at the center of historical exploration and using discourse and culture as indirect avenues towards a more-representational approach. In a study of the Low Countries, Dudink proposes moving beyond the history of masculinity by embedding analysis into the exploration of nation and nationalism (making masculinity a lens through which to view conflict and nation-building). Martin Francis' work on domesticity through a cultural lens moves beyond the history of masculinity because "men constantly travelled back and forward across the frontier of domesticity, if only in the realm of the imagination"; normative codes of behavior do not fully encompass the male experience.

Media images of boys and young men may lead to the persistence of harmful concepts of masculinity. According to men's-rights activists, the media does not address men's-rights issues and men are often portrayed negatively in advertising. Peter Jackson called hegemonic masculinity "economically exploitative" and "socially oppressive": "The form of oppression varies from patriarchal controls over women's bodies and reproductive rights, through ideologies of domesticity, femininity and compulsory heterosexuality, to social definitions of the value of work, the nature of skill and the differential remuneration of 'productive' and 'reproductive' labor."

=== Mental health and masculinity ===
In January 2019, the American Psychological Association warned that conforming to traditional standards of masculinity can cause harm to mental health. Rigid adherence to traditional masculine norms can contribute to higher rates of depression, substance abuse, and eating disorders.

=== Masculinity and eating disorders ===
According to a paper submitted by Tracy Tylka to the American Psychological Association, "Instead of seeing a decrease in objectification of women in society, there has just been an increase in the objectification of both sexes. And you can see that in the media today." Men and women restrict food intake in an effort to achieve what they consider an attractively thin body; in extreme cases, this leads to eating disorders. Recent research has shown that the prevalence rates of eating disorders are more common among males than previously thought, with males representing around 33% of eating disorder cases in the United States.

The pursuit of the ideal body contributes to body dissatisfaction, low self-esteem, and the development of eating disorders. Research found that the images of perfect female and male physiques could psychologically harm younger men and women who read fitness and fashion magazines. These ideals of a "perfect body" can lead young women and men to exercise excessively in an effort to achieve what they consider an attractively fit and muscular body, which may lead to body dysmorphic disorder or muscle dysmorphia.

=== Gender-role stress ===
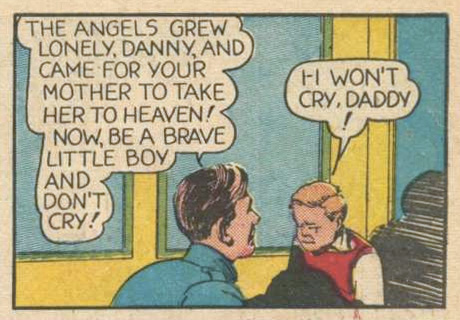
According to social learning theory, teaching boys to suppress vulnerable emotions, as in the saying "big boys don't cry", is a significant part of gender socialization in Western society.

In 1987, Eisler and Skidmore studied masculinity, creating the idea of "masculine stress" and finding three elements of masculinity which often result in emotional stress:

- The emphasis on prevailing in situations requiring body and fitness
- Being perceived as emotional
- The need for adequacy in sexual matters and financial status

Because of social norms and pressures associated with masculinity, men with spinal-cord injuries must adapt their self-identity to the losses associated with such injuries; this may "lead to feelings of decreased physical and sexual prowess with lowered self-esteem and a loss of male identity. Feelings of guilt and overall loss of control are also experienced." Research also suggests that men feel social pressure to endorse traditional masculine male models in advertising. Brett Martin and Juergen Gnoth (2009) found that although feminine men privately preferred feminine models, they expressed a preference for traditional masculine models in public; according to the authors, this reflected social pressure on men to endorse traditional masculine norms.

In their book Raising Cain: Protecting The Emotional Life of Boys, Dan Kindlon and Michael Thompson wrote that although all boys are born loving and empathic, exposure to gender socialization (the tough male ideal and hypermasculinity) limits their ability to function as emotionally healthy adults. According to Kindlon and Thompson, boys lack the ability to understand and express emotions productively because of the stress imposed by masculine gender roles.

In the article "Sexual Ethics, Masculinity and Mutual Vulnerability", Rob Cover works to unpack Judith Butler's study of masculinity. Cover goes over issues such as sexual assault and how it can be partially explained by hypermasculinity.

=== Masculinity in crisis ===
A theory of masculinity in crisis has emerged; Australian archeologist Peter McAllister said, "I have a strong feeling that masculinity is in crisis. Men are really searching for a role in modern society; the things we used to do aren't in much demand anymore". Others see the changing labor market as a source of stress. Deindustrialization and the replacement of smokestack industries by technology have allowed more women to enter the labor force, reducing its emphasis on physical strength.

The crisis has also been attributed to the questioning of male dominance and rights granted to men solely on the basis of sex following the feminist movement. British sociologist John MacInnes wrote that "masculinity has always been in one crisis or another", suggesting that the crises arise from the "fundamental incompatibility between the core principle of modernity that all human beings are essentially equal (regardless of their sex) and the core tenet of patriarchy that men are naturally superior to women and thus destined to rule over them".

According to John Beynon, masculinity and men are often conflated and it is unclear whether masculinity, men or both are in crisis. He writes that the "crisis" is not a recent phenomenon, illustrating several periods of masculine crisis throughout history (some predating the women's movement and post-industrial society), suggesting that due to masculinity's fluid nature "crisis is constitutive of masculinity itself". Film scholar Leon Hunt also writes: "Whenever masculinity's 'crisis' actually started, it certainly seems to have been in place by the 1970s".

With consideration to the experiences of LGBTQ communities, James Gardiner argues in Australian Feminist Studies that "detachment or disaffection with masculinity does not have to lead to an identity crisis and can instead be part of a feminist killjoy survival kit."

=== East Asian cultures ===
In 2008, the word "herbivore men" became popular in Japan and was reported worldwide. Herbivore men refers to young Japanese men who naturally detach themselves from masculinity. Masahiro Morioka characterizes them as men 1) having gentle nature, 2) not bound by manliness, 3) not aggressive when it comes to romance, 4) viewing women as equals, and 5) hating emotional pain. Herbivore men are severely criticized by men who love masculinity. Some contemporary Japanese writers like Ao Omae have made the nature of masculinity a focus of their fiction.

In Chinese and Taiwanese popular culture, phrases such as "大 男人" (lit. 'big man'), "死 異男" (lit. 'damned hetero male'), and "直男癌" (lit. 'straight male cancer') are used as pejoratives referring to men exhibiting misogyny, dominance, and homophobia.

=== East African cultures ===
During Margrethe Silberschmidt's research of urban and rural men in East Africa, she concludes that men experience disempowerment when they cannot fulfill their role as breadwinner and feel inferior to women when they cannot provide for their family. The changes in East Africa's cultural and economic framework can partially be attributed to British colonial rule because it altered the gender division of labor. There was an increase in wage labor which led to a demand for more skilled workers in an environment where there were primarily unskilled workers. Eventually, there was a shift to growing cash crops and the emphasis was put on men to be the breadwinner. A man's social value is traditionally connected to his ability to provide so when he can no longer do that, it negatively impacts his ego. Masculinity is seen as an entity to be protected, and when a man feels disempowered, he finds other ways to reaffirm their masculinity. Research that examines the struggles among men and look into their personal experiences can help to understand the social structures of masculinity.

== In the Global South ==
=== Westernized influence in the media ===
Masculinities as depicted in the media of countries categorized as the Global South can depict stereotypical gender roles in various ways. In India, such roles have been pushed through Bollywood films. Additionally, there is some indication that Westernized views of masculinity have been pushed onto a global audience through print media advertisements, as well. This has been observed in India with the expansion of availability of transnational men's magazines. While there is some evidence of Western and specifically, North American, influence in advertisements found in Chinese and Taiwanese men's magazines as well, it seems that more often than not, those countries' magazines have just adopted a globally uniform perception of masculinity. This theme also presents itself in visual depictions of men in Afghanistan and the Democratic Republic of the Congo.

Sports media outlets have not necessarily promoted a completely "Westernized" version of masculinity, and white, male sports icons may have had an impact when presented alongside those players of other races, such as Asians or black people. A 2019 study found that in Major League Baseball, for example, Korean players and their respective accomplishments tend to be pushed to the side when compared with white, male players in print media and online news outlets.

Novels may be affected by Westernized perceptions. Amjad Alsyouf argues that African novelists Tayeb Salih and Chinua Achebe, for example, bring some Western influence to the gender roles portrayed in their respective novels.

=== Visual portrayals in fashion ===
Masculinity is also an important concept in advertisement branding in the Islamic culture. In Kuwait, Muslim men must remain vigilant in making sure that their consumption decisions are representative of the socially accepted masculine norms — particularly in regard to their fashion choices. Additionally, advertising in fashion branding choices and its effectiveness has been examined in the context of Chinese male consumers' choices. Men interested in wearing luxury fashion brands were often more concerned with making sure their choices were visually representative of a more professional and refined person, as opposed to someone that simply looked tough or strong. This kind of focus on visual portrayals can also appear in media depictions. In the Japanese film Sooshokukeidanshi, one of the main characters is made to appear like more of an outsider than the other male characters because of his unique style choices being seen as less traditionally masculine than the cultural expectation is, in Japan.

=== Effects on youth ===
Adharsh Raj and Manash Pratim Goswami write that in India, young people often copy negative behaviors seen as being traditionally masculine in Bollywood films. Turkish young people can also fall prey to such negative media influence, According to Özlem Akkaya. In a 2018 study, young males often thought that the violent behavior displayed by the main character, "Behzat", in the Turkish television crime series, Behzat Ç. Bir Ankara Polisiyesi, was relatable to what they already experienced in their own day-to-day lives (and therefore, saw violence as a seemingly reasonable thing to occur in the series).

=== Fatherhood ===
In the Global South, many societies still follow very patriarchal norms. Through media depictions and real-life scenarios, men are seen as being the head of the family — those that provide financially, have decision making power, and really are in charge. The image of the nuclear family being the societal norm is also ever-present in many places. When men are not able to fulfill that traditionally masculine, fatherly role, they may have a difficult time proving themselves as being worthy enough to have relationships with their children. In South Africa, for example, females often take on more of a culturally masculine role in providing for the household, due to the high percentage of absent fathers in some communities. Fathers' decision to desert the mother and their biological child is fairly common in South Africa, particularly with regard to those fathers who are younger and come from lower income families. They are often trying to provide for their own nuclear families and cannot also fulfill the cultural obligations commonly attached to fatherhood.

=== Efforts toward gender equality ===
While gender equality has not been achieved, changes are happening in regard to these commonly believed gender roles, particularly with gender justice work in the Global South. In New Delhi, India, males are more frequently becoming involved in this work, while also trying to remain mindful of how their privileged status as men affects the public perception of what they are doing. In Pakistan, the tide is also turning, and men's involvement in opposing violence against women is generally seen as being very positive, a good thing for all. However, there are some who still very much see conflict and violence against women as simply going hand in hand with those cultures.

Some want to shift the focus from specifically viewing females as the ones deserving of stronger rights to everyone deserving the opportunity to be viewed as an equal; however, this can create the potential for men to fall back into the mindset of "male victimhood", as opposed to focusing on female oppression. Although gender equality is becoming a more acknowledged topic in South Africa, for instance, fathers would often rather still hold on to the more traditional gender roles – and pass those ideas down to their sons.

The International Men and Gender Equality Survey (IMAGES) has also been developed and the results from countries in the Global South studied more in recent years. Although the survey indicated areas for further improvement, a significant recent finding comes in regard to men's childhood upbringing and their attitudes surrounding gender equality. If men were raised seeing more equal division of household labor tasks, older female relatives working in non-traditional occupations, less violence toward females, etc., those behaviors and attitudes had a tendency to carry over into their adult lives, according to the survey.

A 2012 study found some evidence that youth have perhaps, inadvertently, made contributions toward greater acceptance of gender equality. Popular culture consumed by youth and those of lesser social status in East Asia, including manga, singing competitions, bands, and more are starting to showcase more modernized males that combine some stereotypically masculine and feminine aspects in their behaviors.

In South Africa, stricter governmental policies are being put into place regarding abuse and violence. Additionally, initiatives like the "One Man Can" program were formed, which aim to provide HIV prevention and an anti-violence program to men in the country. The 'We Can End Violence against Women' campaign is another anti-violence initiative in Pakistan, developed by the Oxfam GB group in South Asia. In 2019, the program garnered much voluntary male participation in its gender equality work out of Afghanistan and Pakistan.

== See also ==
- Brannon Masculinity Scale
- Christian manliness
- Emasculation
- Femininity
- Gender role
- Men's World Day
- Model of masculinity under fascist Italy
- Muscular Christianity
- Mythopoetic men's movement
- Toxic masculinity
- Virility
