= Victorian masculinity =

Social expectations in 19th century British Empire

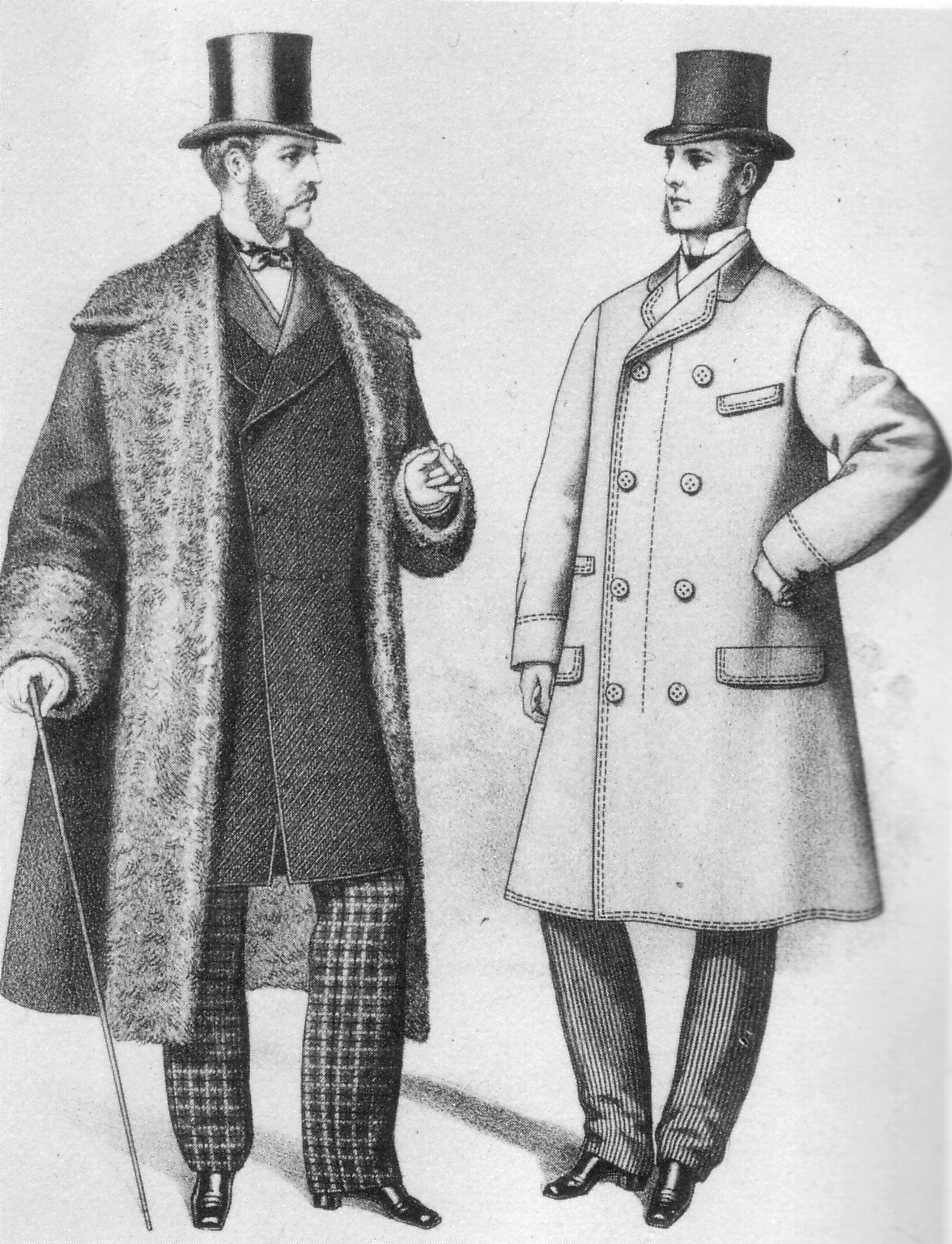
Men's fashions in the 1870s

During the Victorian era, there were, as in all eras, certain social expectations that the separate genders were expected to adhere to in the United Kingdom and the British Empire. The study of Victorian masculinity is based on the assumption that "the construction of male consciousness must be seen as historically specific." The concept of Victorian masculinity is extremely diverse, since it was influenced by numerous aspects and factors such as domesticity, economy, gender roles, imperialism, manners, religion, sporting competition, and much more. Some of these aspects seem to be quite naturally related to one another, while others seem profoundly non-relational. For Victorian men, this included a vast amount of pride in their work, a protectiveness over their wives, and an aptitude for good social behaviour. The concept of Victorian masculinity is a topic of interest in the context of cultural studies with a special emphasis on gender studies. The topic is of interest in the areas of history, literary criticism, religious studies, and sociology. Those values that have survived to the present day are of special interest to critics for their role in sustaining the "dominance of the Western male".

== Origins ==
The study of Victorian masculinity is based on the assumption that "the construction of male consciousness must be seen as historically specific."

The Victorians saw manliness as good, a form of control over maleness, which was brutish. Furthermore, men increasingly formed secret societies, such as the Masons and the Oddfellows.

=== Christianity and patriarchy ===
Christianity contributed to the Victorian concept of masculinity. The "real" Victorian man was to be spiritual and a faithful believer. Hence, the husband and father was considered to be the pater familias with extensive power. As the head of the household, his duty was not only to lead, but also to protect his wife and children.

=== Industrialism ===
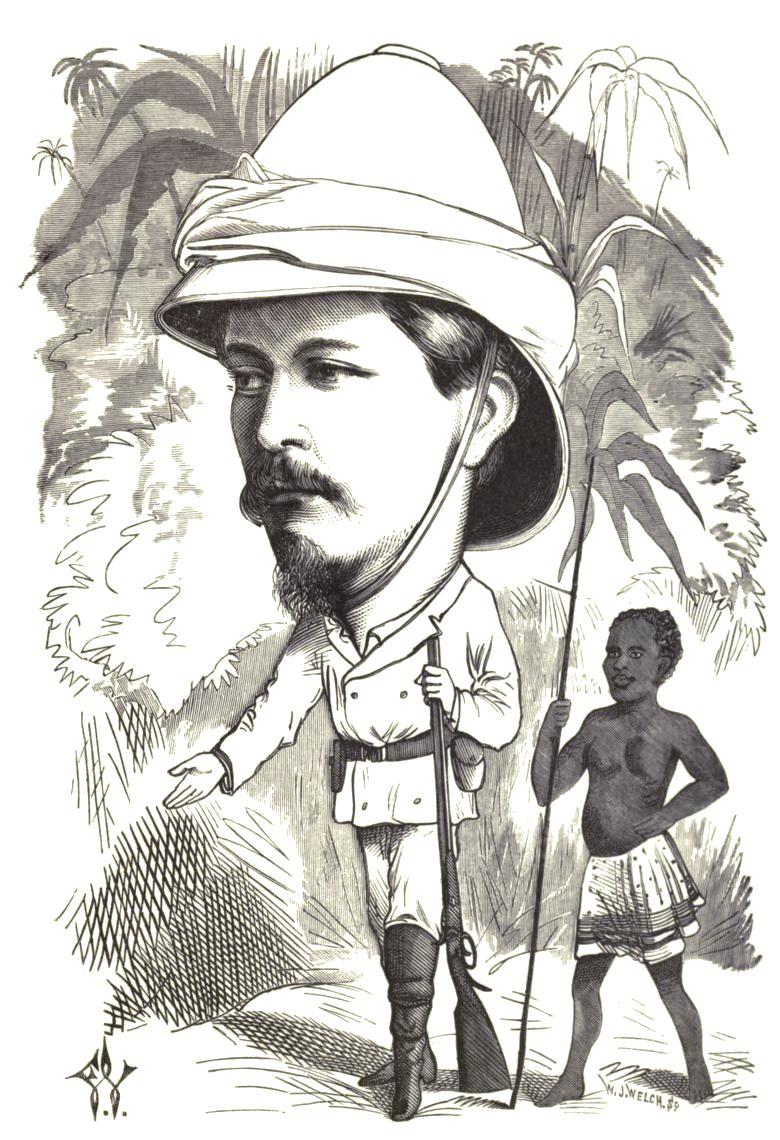
African explorer Henry Morton Stanley

Like in the private sphere, men of the Victorian era were equally active in the public sphere (in contrast to women). Work was crucial in order to achieve a fully masculine status. This was especially true for the middle-class man; male members of the aristocracy were seen as idle because they generally did not work. By being active in enterprise, men fulfilled their duty as breadwinners in the sense that they had to provide for their families. Since home and work were perceived as very separate spheres, working at home was a delicate matter, for example for writers, who had to fear their masculine status being threatened. Besides work, Victorian men were also active in the public sphere of clubs and taverns, indulging in homosociality.

The rise of scientific management principles also change the way other spheres like sport were viewed: there was a shift away from the early Victorian discourse of "fair play" as the most important aspect of sport, to one promoting "scientific" study of sport in order to win and make money.

== Muscular Christianity ==
With the beginning of the second half of the 19th century, the picture of the ideal of manliness started to shift. Due to publications such as Charles Darwin's The Origin of Species (1859), and Friedrich Nietzsche's philosophical claims concerning the "death of God" (1882), the main focus in the concept of masculinity shifted from a spiritual focus on religion towards a commitment to muscle: Muscular Christianity was created. At the same time, male domesticity decreased.

=== Sports and readiness for physical combat ===
The development towards a focus on muscle manifested itself in the belief that in order to educate one's mind one had to educate one's body. This assumption has its roots in the rise of natural science and especially biology. Thus, a fascination with health led to a sports and game-playing mania, which was primarily acted out through the public school system for boys. The athlete was the new hero of society. This, according to E. M. Forster, then led to "well-developed bodies, fairly developed minds, and undeveloped hearts". Another reason for such drills was that by the end of the 19th century the British Empire was perceived to be in danger and athletic public school boys made good recruits.

=== Imperialism ===
In the second half of the 19th century, the ideal of Victorian manliness became increasingly defined by imperialism because the subordination of non-Western cultures was in its heyday in Britain. Thus, part of the concept of masculinity became military and patriotic virtue, which defined the ideal man as courageous and enduring like hunters, adventurers, and pioneers, all of whom were profoundly self-sufficient and independent and had broad scientific knowledge. This orientation towards hardiness and endurance was reflected by a change in clothing as well: rich colors and materials were discouraged in favor of dark colors, straight cuts, and stiff materials.

== See also ==
- Masculinity
- Victorian fashion
- 19th century American manliness
- Christian manliness

== Bibliography ==
- Danahay, Martin (2005). Gender at work in Victorian culture: literature, art and masculinity. Aldershot, Hants, England: Ashgate Pub. ISBN 0-7546-5292-0.
- Davidoff, Leonore; Catherine Hall (2002). Family fortunes: men and women of the English middle class, 1780–1850 (Revised ed.). Routledge. ISBN 0-415-29064-3.
- Mangan, James Anthony; James Walvin (1991). Manliness and Morality: Middle-class Masculinity in Britain and America, 1800–1940. Manchester University Press. ISBN 0-7190-2367-X.
- Sussman, Herbert (1992). "The Study of Victorian Masculinities". Victorian Literature and Culture. 20: 366–377. doi:10.1017/S106015030000526X.
- Tosh, John (2007). A Man's Place: Masculinity and the Middle-Class Home in Victorian England. Yale University Press. ISBN 978-0-300-12362-3.
- Tozer, Malcolm, Physical Education at Thring's Uppingham, Uppingham: Uppingham School, 1976. (ISBN B000XZ39VY).
- Tozer, Malcolm, The Ideal of Manliness: The Legacy of Thring's Uppingham, Truro: Sunnyrest Books, 2015. (ISBN 978-1-326-41574-7, hardback; ISBN 978-1-329-54273-0, paperback).
