= Brannon Masculinity Scale =

Measure of endorsement of masculine norms

The Brannon Masculinity Scale (BMS) is based on Robert Brannon (1976) and Samuel Juni's analysis of the American culture's "blueprint" of what men are supposed to be. This includes their needs, wants, and successes. The concept makes the presumption that masculinity is centered around 4 themes, which is referred to as Brannon's 4 Models of Masculinity.

The four sections are titled "No Sissy Stuff", "The Big Wheel", "The Sturdy Oak" and "Give 'em Hell". Each section contains 2 subscales with 15-16 items each. Each item is rated on a 7-point scale from strongly agree to strongly disagree. Scores are meant to determine how "masculine" the test-taker is.

== Brannon's 4 Models of Masculinity ==
=== No "Sissy Stuff" ===
The No Sissy Stuff concept, which can be summarized as the stigma of anything feminine, has 2 subscales that contain 16 items each. The first subscale is titled "Avoiding Femininity" and the second is called "Concealing emotions".

The goal of this section is to reinforce the ideology that openness and vulnerability in men were viewed as wimpy and effeminate. Men were taught from a young age to avoid acting feminine at all costs and to show no weakness. This means that many men are prone to bottling up intimate or emotional aspects of their lives.

Some examples of items in these subsections include:

- Emotions are alright for women, but men are not like that.
- Public displays of emotion (other than anger) lead to a rapid decline of prestige.
- Development of the ability to hide these feelings is the first hurdle confronting men in our society.
- The only time when an outburst of, such as tears, will be accepted by others is after a man has achieved something extremely prestigious (e.g., winning an election).
- To show doubts and insecurities would reveal men to be "less than" they have claimed to be.

=== The Big Wheel ===
The Big Wheel concept can be summarized as success, status, and the need to be looked up to. This section is also divided into two subscales with 15-16 items apiece. The two subscales are titled "Being the Breadwinner" and "Being admired and respected."

The goal of this section is to double down on the previous section that success is masculine, and you must avoid femininity. Success and status are the bedrock elements of the male sex role. Success is not only defined as financial and career success; it can also translate to relationships and sexual prowess.

A few examples of some of the items on these subscales include:

- Measuring a man's success based on their work and career. This is the easiest way of seeing how much money or how much power a man has.
- Measuring a man's athletic ability.
- Measuring a man's sexual performance.
- Generally anything that can be done competitively can be measured to show success.

=== The Sturdy Oak ===
The Sturdy Oak concept highlights toughness and stability in men as an asset. The Sturdy Oak is in contrast to a woman being "a clinging vine". Men who are truly manly are supposed to be self-reliant and confident and need minimal emotional support.

This section is once again divided into two subscales. The titles of these subsections are "Toughness" and "The male machine". These sections double down on men not being scared in the face of adversity, as well as taking care of themselves.

Some of the items in this section include:

- Toughness
- Confidence
- Self-reliance
- Strength
- Independence
- Cool determined
- Unflappable

From early childhood on, most boys are told to "be a man" but they are given few concrete ideas on how to achieve this. A man cannot be all of those traits at once and that leads to men looking somewhere else for inspiration to be the "perfect man". This leads to many men reaching out to popular entertainment figures and public personalities for guidance.

=== The Give 'em Hell ===
The Give 'em Hell concept asserts that men should be aggressive and competitive. It is important that men are adventurous and willing to resort to violence if necessary. It reinforces dated concepts that gentle men are not seen as manly.

Being competitive and aggressive ties in with "the big wheel" section as well, however, this section really focuses more on aggression and violence in areas such as sports and conflict.

There are two subscales titled "violence" and the other one titled "adventure". There are 15 items in each scale. Some examples of these items include:

- "A real man enjoys a bit of danger now and then."
- "A man always deserves the respect of his wife and children."
- Living life on the edge through an outgoing spirit of adventure
- Sometimes an unsuccessful man is acclaimed for his masculinity simply because it is known that he will use force at the slightest excuse.

== Controversy ==
The main controversy behind the Brannon Masculinity Scale is that it pushes stereotypical masculinity constructs on men. If men are unhappy with their score, they may start to display problematic behavior in order to appear more "manly". By promoting a perspective of dominance on masculinity, Brannon's masculinity scale promotes the idea that heteronormative masculinity is a competition against other men, encouraging violence as means of dominance

The scale was originally A 110 item masculinity scale to measure individuals' approval of the norms and values that define the male role. The 4 sections are used to summarize the main principles of the scale and the most important parts of masculinity.

The strength of the scale is that it includes different measurements of masculinity, without comparing men to women. It highlights problems men face in society while simultaneously reinforcing stereotypes that cause these issues.

The male sex role theory was popularized by Robert Brannon (the namesake of BMS). Though the system is problematic, it created a great foundation for gender studies, specifically studies concerning masculinity.

The Brannon Masculinity Scale is rarely used to measure masculinity today, as it was replaced by R.W Connell's Hegemonic Masculinity Theory.
