= Christian manliness =

Movement in Victorian Protestant England

Christian manliness is a concept and movement that arose in Victorian Protestant England, characterised by the importance of the male body and physical health, family and romantic love, the notions of morality, theology and the love for nature and, the idea of healthy patriotism, with Jesus Christ as leader and example of truest manhood. The concept was first brought up in novels by the British Victorian writers Charles Kingsley and Thomas Hughes. Schoolmaster of the Rugby School, Thomas Arnold, was responsible for reforming the British public schooling system according to notions of biblical manhood. The Christian masculinity movement can still be observed in the Anglosphere today, and although it shares a great deal with the notions and ideals originating from the Victorian era, it is distinct and shaped by the constraints and conditions of the modern post-industrial era. The American evangelical community places emphasis upon Christian masculinity.

== Nineteenth-century origins ==
The term Christian masculinity originated in a popular religious work written in 1867 by Reverend S. S. Pugh and was used frequently by Victorian preachers to link Christian virtue with other secular notions of moral and physical prowess.

However, it was mostly introduced in Charles Kingsley and Thomas Hughes' novels like Alton Locke (1850) and Tom Brown’s School Days (1857). Kingsley was a broad-church priest of the Church of England, a social reformist and a novelist. Thomas Hughes was a lawyer, politician and writer, most known for his novel Tom Brown’s School Days (1857). The novel takes place in Thomas Arnold’s Rugby School. These schools had for goal to produce the perfect Christian gentlemen. They focused on three ideas: religious and moral principles, gentlemanly conduct and intellectual ability. These ideas were popular during the Victorian Era during which there was a strong religious drive for higher moral standards. They are the basis for the concept of Christian masculinity.

== Protestant proto-Christian manliness ==
Aspects of the later Christian manliness movement do appear in the writings of Protestants before the nineteenth century, but it was not until the nineteenth century that ideas became popularised and fine-tuned in the Anglosphere.

In their work Masculinity in the Reformation Era, Scott H. Hendrix and Susan C. Karant-Nunn "examine the ways in which sixteenth- and seventeenth-century authorities, both secular and religious, labored to turn boys and men into the Christian males they desired."

== Characteristics ==
=== The male body and physical health ===
The preservation and cultivation of the male body is an integral feature of the idea of Christian manliness, with some commenting on the parallelism of "the body of the Christ". This aspect is why it is often confused with Muscular Christianity, which focuses on physical strength and athleticism specifically in sports. This idea is also very often linked to physical needs and physical drives.

For Kingsley, physical manliness also showed "condition of psychological, moral and spiritual health." Norman Vance writes "physical strength, courage and health are attractive, valuable and useful in themselves and in the eyes of God."

=== Family and romantic love ===
Kingsley believed that marriage and family were necessary for human and manly dignity. In this aspect of the notion of Christian manliness, its roots are visible in Protestantism rather than Catholicism. This advocacy for marriage and family comes with the role of the patriarch, and a stress on "family relationships as the proper context of manly Christianity." The idea is very much linked to sexuality and physical drives as well that are encouraged rather than dismissed. Kingsley valued physical relations as a capital part of manhood. About this Norman Vance writes, "the emotional ties of family and of romantic and married love are natural and pleasing to responsibilities."

David Alderson also writes that "marriage is part of that true relation to the world which is indicative of manhood."

=== Theology and love for nature ===
"The natural world was created for man to admire and to understand and subdue through sustained intellectual and scientific enquiry which would also disclose the pattern of the moral universe underlying the natural world." By this, Norman Vance means that men should end up with a proper moral and spiritual understanding of the world God created. The perfect "Christian man" should admire the world created by God and study it intellectually and scientifically.

Aside from the theological positions of Protestantism and Catholicism with respect to justification, Christology, the sacraments, and salvation, the Christian man believes himself to be in a struggle with his "flesh", and with spiritual and heavenly "principalities and powers". The Christian man restrains evil by exercising just authority, and by putting on the "armour of God": the "belt of truth", the "breastplate of righteousness", the "shield of faith", the "sandals" of the gospel of peace, the "helmet of salvation", and the "sword of the Spirit, which is the word of God". (Ephesians 6:10–18)

=== Patriotism and service to Christ ===
"Man, endowed with strength and natural affections and the capacity to explore and work in the service of his brother man and of God, as patriot or social reformer or crusading doctor."

=== Morality, continence and celibacy ===
Kingsley promoted the moral virtues as found in the teachings of Christ, and the Epistles of St Paul. Continence was seen as vital to retaining energy and the drive for life, and celibacy was tolerated for those on the frontiers of the empire, or for those suited for the "gift".

=== Liberty and freedom ===
The notion that the Protestant man contends for freedom of conscience, enterprise, and information has been dominant since the Reformation.

== Modern evangelicalism ==
John Piper, Wayne Grudem, John MacArthur, Charles Stanley, all American evangelical Protestants, have promoted a distinct Christian manliness, even a call to return to traditional manhood. American evangelicalism maintains that the Bible is the text that supports notions of Christian manliness, and ultimately, the life and example of Jesus Christ. Appeals to Pauline texts are frequent, and models of servant leadership and complementarianism feature in sermons and literature.

Within the evangelical community there is broad agreement regarding morality, theology, the body and servant leadership, although post-modern issues have sparked controversy in recent years. Many evangelical leaders are critical of the feminist movement and gender deconstructionism, citing them as attempts to undermine manhood, and therefore threatening to the stability of societal relationship formation, family cohesion, and the nation as a whole.

=== Jesus Christ and St Paul ===
Jesus Christ is considered by Christians to have been a perfect embodiment of manliness. Thomas Hughes' book, The Manliness of Christ, attempts to enunciate the "manly" attributes of Christ's ministry. The apostle Paul is often seen as a prime example of Christian manliness.

=== Complementarianism as a component ===
Complementarianism is the functional differentiation between a husband and wife, with the man as the spiritual "head." The notion of male headship is most commonly found in the Epistles of St Paul. The Puritan Matthew Henry summarised the position: "Women were created from the rib of man to be beside him, not from his head to top him, nor from his feet to be trampled by him, but from under his arm to be protected by him, near to his heart to be loved by him."

== Victorian Britain ==
In Kingsley’s novel Alton Locke (1850), the man "explores the nature of human society and the opportunities for manly Christian work within and for it". Kingsley vouched for the "adventurous openness" combining "the courage of the pilgrim or questing knight with the intelligence and alertness of the Baconian scientist". During the days of the British Empire, notions of Christian manliness were infused into books for young men and stories for young boys. Elegant poems flowed forth from pens, and works were written, drawing upon relevant passages in the Bible.

In the 1890s, the conversation around degeneration, created a concern for the British Empire and the British people. The concerns that the British Empire might be flagging led to a deep surveillance of the nation’s fitness. This aspect of Christian manliness groups both types identified by Vance, physical and moral manliness. This also encouraged tougher education similar to the Rugby School as well as the Boy Scouts program created by Baden Powell.

=== The Young Men's Christian Association (YMCA) ===
The YMCA was founded on 6 June 1844 by Sir George Williams, and aimed to put Christian principles into practice. The development and pursuit of a healthy "body, mind and spirit" were at the heart of the YMCA movement, which has continued influence in present times.

Along with the Boy Scouts, the YMCA is considered part of the legacy of the Christian manliness movement in the Anglosphere.

== Publications ==
- J. C. Ryle, Thoughts for Young Men (1865)
- S. S. Pugh, Christian Manliness: A Book of Examples and Principles for Young Men (1866)
- Thomas Hughes, The Manliness of Christ (1879)
- Thomas Hughes, True Manliness (1880)
- James Allen, As a Man Thinketh (1903)
- Robert E. Speer, The Stuff of Manhood (1917)
- John R. Thompson, Christian Manliness (1923)
- Walter McDonald, The Manliness of St Paul (1958)
- Patrick Morley, The Man in the Mirror (1989)
- John Piper and Wayne Grudem, Recovering Biblical Manhood and Womanhood (1991)
- John Eldredge, Wild at Heart (2001)
- Voddie Baucham, What He Must Be (2009)
- Charles Stanley, Man of God (2015)
- Woodrow M. Kroll, Is There A Man In The House? (2001)

== See also ==
- Man of God
- Heroic Virtue
- Muscular Christianity
- Protestantism
- Evangelicalism

== Bibliography ==
- Alderson, David (1998). Mansex Fine: Religion, manliness and imperialism and nineteenth-century British culture. Manchester University Press. OCLC 40636431
- Tosh, John (2016). Manliness and Masculinities in Nineteenth-century Britain: Essays on Gender, Family and Empire (Women and men in history). London: Routledge. ISBN 9781315838533
- Vance, Norman (1985). The Sinews of the Spirit: The Ideal of Christian manliness in Victorian Literature and Religious Thought. Cambridge: Cambridge University Press. ISBN 9780521303873. OCLC 11550261 (all editions).
- Wesseling, Lies (2010). "Unmanning Exoticism: The Breakdown of Christian manliness in the book of the Heathen". In Kohlke, Marie-Luise; Gutleben, Christian (eds.). Neo-Victorian tropes of taruma: The politics of bearing after-witness to nineteenth-century suffering. Neo-Victorian series. Vol. 1. Amsterdam: Rodopi. OCLC 694729215 (all editions).
