= Susan C. Karant-Nunn =

American historian

President of the Sixteenth Century Society and Conference
- In office 1992–1993

Personal details
- Born: Susan Catherine Karant Evanston, Illinois, U.S.
- Spouses: John I. Boles (m. 1962): Frederick M. Nunn
- Education: Cornell College; Indiana University
- Occupation: Historian
- Awards: Guggenheim Fellowship (2003)

Academic background
- Thesis: Lutheran Pastors in Ernestine Saxony and Thuringia, 1521–1346 (1971)
- Doctoral advisor: Gerald Strauss

Academic work
- Discipline: History of religion
- Sub-discipline: Reformation in Germany
- Institutions: Portland State University; University of Arizona

Susan Catherine Karant-Nunn is an American historian. A 2003 Guggenheim Fellow, she has written on the Reformation, including books like Luther's Pastors (1979), Zwickau in Transition, 1500–1547 (1987), The Reformation of Ritual (1997), The Reformation of Feeling (2010), and The Personal Luther (2017). She was president of the Sixteenth Century Society and Conference in 1992 and became director of the University of Arizona's Division for Late Medieval and Reformation Studies in 2001.

== Biography ==
Susan Catherine Karant-Nunn was born in Evanston, Illinois. She later obtained her BA (1963) at Cornell College, as well as her MA (1967) and PhD (1971) at Indiana University. Her dissertation Lutheran Pastors in Ernestine Saxony and Thuringia, 1521–1346 was supervised by Gerald Strauss, and the East German government allowed her to personally visit the archives for her doctoral work.

In 1970, she started working at Portland State University (PSU) as an assistant professor of history, and she was promoted to associate professor in 1975 and professor in 1983. In 1999, she moved from PSU to the University of Arizona as an associate professor of history, and she was promoted to professor in 2001. She became director of University of Arizona's Division for Late Medieval and Reformation Studies in 2001. In 2009, she was appointed Regents' Professor. She was one of three financial benefactors of the Heiko A. Oberman Chair in Late Medieval and Reformation History, and in 2016, the Susan C. Karant-Nunn Chair in Reformation and early modern European History was anonymosly endowed at the University of Arizona.

Karant-Nunn specializes in the Reformation, particularly in Germany. In 1979, she republished her dissertation as the book Luther's Pastors. In 1987, she authored another book, Zwickau in Transition, 1500–1547. She was vice-president (1991) and president (1992) of the Sixteenth Century Society and Conference. She was a 1993–1994 Fulbright Scholar at the University of Tübingen; her project, named The Modification of Ecclesiastical Ritual in 16th-Century Germany, funded her research for her 1997 book The Reformation of Ritual. In 2003, she was awarded a Guggenheim Fellowship for "a study of the molding of religious fervor in the German reformations"; this allowed her to finish the research for her 2010 book The Reformation of Feeling. She has also served as president of the Society for Reformation Research, and she won their 2016 Bodo Nischan Award. She later wrote the books The Personal Luther (2017) and Ritual, Gender, and Emotions (2022). In 2020, Brill released the 223rd volume of its Studies in Medieval and Reformation Traditions series, Cultural Shifts and Ritual Transformations in Reformation Europe, as a festschrift in her honor.

Karant-Nunn also served as the editor or a co-editor for several volumes, specifically Germania Illustrata (1992), Luther on Women: A Sourcebook (2003), The Work of Heiko A. Oberman (2003), Varieties of Devotion in the Middle Ages and Renaissance (2003), Masculinity in the Reformation Era (2008), and Reformation Research in Europe and North America (2010). She and Anne Jacobson Schutte were one of the two North American managing co-editor for the Archive for Reformation History from 1998 until 2010.

She married John I. Boles, her Cornell College classmate, on September 2, 1962. She later married historian Frederick M. Nunn.

== Bibliography ==
- Luther's Pastors (1979)
- Zwickau in Transition, 1500–1547 (1987)
- (ed. with Andrew C. Fix) Germania Illustrata (1992)
- The Reformation of Ritual (1997)
- (ed. with Merry E. Wiesner-Hanks) Luther on Women: A Sourcebook (2003)
- (ed. with Katherine G. Brady, Thomas A. Brady, and James Tracy) The Work of Heiko A. Oberman (2003)
- (ed.) Varieties of Devotion in the Middle Ages and Renaissance (2003)
- (ed. with Scott E. Hendrix) Masculinity in the Reformation Era (2008)
- The Reformation of Feeling (2010)
- (ed.) Reformation Research in Europe and North America (2010; Archive for Reformation History volume 100)
- The Personal Luther (2017)
- Ritual, Gender, and Emotions (2022)
