= 2005–06 AFC Ajax season =

Dutch football club season

Ajax
2005–06 season
- Chairman: John Jaakke
- Manager: Danny Blind
- Eredivisie: 4th
- KNVB Cup: Winners
- Champions League: Round of 16
- Johan Cruyff Shield: Winners
- Top goalscorer: League: Klaas-Jan Huntelaar (16 goals); All: Klaas-Jan Huntelaar (22 goals)
Home colours	Away colours	European home colours

During the 2005–06 Dutch football season AFC Ajax participated in the Eredivisie, the KNVB Cup and the UEFA Champions League. The first training took place on 3 July 2005. The traditional AFC Ajax Open Day was on 3 August 2005.

== Pre-season ==
The first training for the 2005–06 season was held on 3 July 2005. In preparation for the new season, Ajax organized a training camp in De Lutte, Netherlands, at the De Thij Sportpark. During the pre-season, the squad from manager Danny Blind played friendly matches against DWV, WHC, Quick '20, HHC Hardenberg, Rijnsburgse Boys, Fortuna Sittard, Arminia Bielefeld and FC Omniworld. They then returned to Amsterdam to play Arsenal and Boca Juniors in the annual Amsterdam Tournament.

== Player statistics ==
Appearances for competitive matches only

No.	Pos	Nat	Player	Total		Eredivisie		UEFA C.L.		KNVB Cup	
No.	Pos	Nat	Player	Apps	Goals	Apps	Goals	Apps	Goals	Apps	Goals
1	GK	(Netherlands) NED	Maarten Stekelenburg	37	0	27	0	6	0	4	0
2	DF	(Tunisia) TUN	Hatem Trabelsi	30	0	20	0	7+1	0	2	0
3	DF	(Czech Republic) CZE	Zdeněk Grygera	27	1	18	1	8	0	1	0
4	DF	(Netherlands) NED	John Heitinga	28	1	13+6	1	3+3	0	2+1	0
6	MF	(Czech Republic) CZE	Tomáš Galásek	36	4	25+1	4	5+1	0	3+1	0
7	FW	(Argentina) ARG	Mauro Rosales	35	2	23+6	0	3+1	1	2	1
8	MF	(Netherlands) NED	Hedwiges Maduro	40	3	27+1	3	9	0	1+2	0
9	FW	(Greece) GRE	Angelos Charisteas	24	9	7+10	8	1+3	0	2+1	1
10	MF	(South Africa) RSA	Steven Pienaar	24	2	14+1	2	9	0	0	0
11	FW	(Netherlands) NED	Ryan Babel	37	6	12+13	2	5+4	2	0+3	2
12	GK	(South Africa) RSA	Hans Vonk	12	0	7+1	0	4	0	0	0
15	DF	(Belgium) BEL	Thomas Vermaelen	33	4	22+2	3	5	0	4	1
17	FW	(Greece) GRE	Yannis Anastasiou	9	3	3+3	0	3	3	0	0
18	MF	(Netherlands) NED	Wesley Sneijder	29	11	18+1	5	7	4	3	2
19	MF	(Netherlands) NED	Urby Emanuelson	36	2	22+4	1	8	0	2	1
21	DF	(Netherlands) NED	Olaf Lindenbergh	26	0	16+2	0	5	0	2+1	0
22	DF	(Spain) ESP	Juanfran	21	0	11+5	0	2+1	0	2	0
24	FW	(Sweden) SWE	Markus Rosenberg	43	14	28+3	12	6+2	2	4	0
25	FW	(Netherlands) NED	Klaas-Jan Huntelaar	21	22	16	16	2	1	3	5
27	MF	(Armenia) ARM	Edgar Manucharyan	5	0	2+2	0	0+1	0	0	0
28	MF	(Morocco) MAR	Nourdin Boukhari	36	6	17+7	4	7+2	1	3	1
29	FW	(Romania) ROU	Nicolae Mitea	1	0	0+1	0	0	0	0	0
30	GK	(Netherlands) NED	Kenneth Vermeer	0	0	0	0	0	0	0	0
31	DF	(Ghana) GHA	Emmanuel Boakye	7	0	3+3	0	0	0	1	0
32	MF	(Netherlands Antilles) ANT	Vurnon Anita	2	0	1	0	0	0	1	0
33	DF	(Netherlands) NED	Robbert Schilder	4	0	2+2	0	0	0	0	0
36	FW	(Netherlands) NED	Rydell Poepon	0	0	0	0	0	0	0	0
37	MF	(Netherlands Antilles) ANT	Javier Martina	0	0	0	0	0	0	0	0
38	MF	(Netherlands) NED	Jeffrey Sarpong	10	0	4+5	0	0	0	0+1	0
39	MF	(Netherlands) NED	John Goossens	0	0	0	0	0	0	0	0
45	DF	(Netherlands) NED	Michael Timisela	4	1	2+2	1	0	0	0	0
52	FW	(Netherlands) NED	Derk Boerrigter	0	0	0	0	0	0	0	0
56	MF	(Belgium) BEL	Jan Vertonghen	0	0	0	0	0	0	0	0
58	MF	(Netherlands) NED	Donovan Slijngard	0	0	0	0	0	0	0	0
Players sold or loaned out after the start of the season:
5	DF	(France) FRA	Julien Escudé	4	0	2	0	2	0	0	0
14	MF	(Brazil) BRA	Maxwell	0	0	0	0	0	0	0	0
16	MF	(Netherlands) NED	Nigel de Jong	24	5	12+4	2	5+2	3	1	0
20	FW	(Netherlands) NED	Daniël de Ridder	0	0	0	0	0	0	0	0
26	GK	(Romania) ROU	Bogdan Lobonț	0	0	0	0	0	0	0	0
65	MF	(Argentina) ARG	Sebastián Rusculleda	0	0	0	0	0	0	0	0

As of 26 November 2011

=== Players by nationality ===
Nationality	(Netherlands)	(Belgium)	(Czech Republic)	(South Africa)	(Sweden)	(Netherlands Antilles)	(Argentina)	(Armenia)	(Ghana)	(Morocco)	(Romania)	(Spain)	(Tunisia)	Total Players
Current squad selection	10	1	2	2	1	-	1	1	1	1	1	1	1	23
Youth/reserves squad in AFC Ajax selection	7	1	-	-	-	2	-	-	-	-	-	-	-	10
Players out on loan	1	2	-	-	1	-	-	-	-	-	-	-	-	4

== Team statistics ==
=== Eredivisie standings ===
Standing	Matches played	Wins	Draws	Losses	Points	Goals for	Goals against	Yellow cards (yellow card)	Red cards (red card)
4	34	18	6	10	60	66	41	57	7

==== Points by matchday ====
Matchday	1	2	3	4	5	6	7	8	9	10	11	12	13	14	15	16	17	18	19	20	21	22	23	24	25	26	27	28	29	30	31	32	33	34	Total
Points	1	3	0	1	3	3	3	1	0	1	0	3	0	3	3	3	3	0	1	3	0	0	3	3	3	3	3	1	0	1	0	3	3	3	60

==== Total points by matchday ====
Matchday	1	2	3	4	5	6	7	8	9	10	11	12	13	14	15	16	17	18	19	20	21	22	23	24	25	26	27	28	29	30	31	32	33	34	Total
Points	1	4	4	7	7	10	13	14	14	15	15	18	18	21	21	24	27	30	33	33	34	37	37	37	40	43	46	49	52	53	53	54	57	60	60

==== Standing by matchday ====
Matchday	1	2	3	4	5	6	7	8	9	10	11	12	13	14	15	16	17	18	19	20	21	22	23	24	25	26	27	28	29	30	31	32	33	34	Standing
Standing	6th	4th	6th	6th	6th	5th	5th	5th	5th	6th	6th	6th	9th	8th	6th	4th	4th	4th	6th	4th	7th	8th	6th	5th	4th	4th	4th	4th	4th	5th	5th	5th	4th	4th	4th

==== Goals by matchday ====
Matchday	1	2	3	4	5	6	7	8	9	10	11	12	13	14	15	16	17	18	19	20	21	22	23	24	25	26	27	28	29	30	31	32	33	34	Total
Goals	2	2	1	2	2	2	4	2	0	0	0	0	2	0	4	2	2	3	2	1	3	1	2	1	2	6	3	6	0	2	1	1	2	4	66

=== Overview ===
- This is an overview of all the statistics for played matches in the season.

	Friendlies	Amsterdam Tournament	Johan Cruijff Schaal	KNVB Cup	UEFA Champions League	Eredivisie	UEFA Champions League Qualifying Play-offs	Total
Matches	11	2	1	4	10	34	4	66
Wins	10	0	1	4	4	18	3	40
Draws	1	0	0	0	4	6	0	11
Losses	0	2	0	0	2	10	1	15
Home	1	2	1	2	5	17	2	30
Away	10	0	0	3	5	17	2	37
Yellow cards (yellow card)	8	0	3	7	14	54	4	90
Red cards (red card)	0	0	0	1	0	5	2	8
2 x yellow in 1 match (yellow card) (yellow-red card)	0	0	0	1	0	2	0	3
Number of substitutes used (substituted on) (substituted off)	50	5	2	10	23	85	8	177
Goals for	62	0	2	15	17	66	10	172
Goals against	7	2	1	3	12	41	4	70
Balance	+55	-2	+1	+12	+5	+25	+6	+102
Clean sheets	7	0	0	1	2	12	2	24
Penalties for	3	0	0	0	0	3	0	6
Penalties against	0	0	0	0	1	3	0	4

=== 2005–06 team records ===
Description	Competition	Result
Biggest win	(Netherlands) Friendly match	Rijnsburgse Boys – Ajax ( 0–12 )
Biggest win	(Netherlands) KNVB Cup	FC Eindhoven – Ajax ( 1–6 )
Biggest win	(European Union) UEFA Champions League	Thun – Ajax ( 2–4 )
Biggest win	(Netherlands) Eredivisie	Ajax – RBC Roosendaal ( 6–0 ) Ajax – Sparta Rotterdam ( 6–0 )
Biggest loss	(Netherlands) Friendly match	—
Biggest loss	(Netherlands) KNVB Cup	—
Biggest loss	(European Union) UEFA Champions League	Ajax – Arsenal ( 1–2 )
Biggest loss	(Netherlands) Eredivisie	Ajax – Utrecht ( 1–4 )
Most goals in a match	(Netherlands) Friendly match	Rijnsburgse Boys – Ajax ( 0–12 )
Most goals in a match	(Netherlands) KNVB Cup	FC Eindhoven – Ajax ( 1–6 )
Most goals in a match	(European Union) UEFA Champions League	Thun – Ajax ( 2–4 )
Most goals in a match	(Netherlands) Eredivisie	Ajax – RBC Roosendaal ( 6–0 ) Ajax – Sparta Rotterdam ( 6–0 )

==== Top scorers ====
Friendlies

Nr.	Name	Goal
1.	(Greece) Yannis Anastasiou	10
1.	(Romania) Nicolae Mitea	10
3.	(Morocco) Nourdin Boukhari	6
3.	(Netherlands) Nigel de Jong	6
5.	(Sweden) Markus Rosenberg	5
6.	(Netherlands) Daniël de Ridder	4
7.	(Netherlands) Wesley Sneijder	3
7.	(Netherlands Antilles) Javier Martina	3
9.	(Sweden) Rasmus Lindgren	2
9.	(France) Julien Escudé	2
9.	(Belgium) Jan Vertonghen	2
9.	(Netherlands) Derk Boerrigter	2
13.	(Belgium) Tom De Mul	1
13.	(Czech Republic) Zdeněk Grygera	1
13.	(Czech Republic) Tomáš Galásek	1
13.	(Netherlands) Ryan Babel	1
13.	(Netherlands) John Heitinga	1
13.	(Netherlands) Rydell Poepon	1
Own goals	(Netherlands) Rick Severein (VV Hierden)	1
Total		62

Johan Cruijff Schaal

Nr.	Name	Goal
1.	(Morocco) Nourdin Boukhari	1
1.	(Netherlands) Ryan Babel	1
Total		2

Eredivisie

Nr.	Name	Goal
1.	(Netherlands) Klaas-Jan Huntelaar	16
2.	(Sweden) Markus Rosenberg	12
3.	(Greece) Angelos Charisteas	8
4.	(Netherlands) Wesley Sneijder	5
5.	(Czech Republic) Tomáš Galásek	4
5.	(Morocco) Nourdin Boukhari	4
7.	(Netherlands) Hedwiges Maduro	3
7.	(Belgium) Thomas Vermaelen	3
9.	(South Africa) Steven Pienaar	2
9.	(Netherlands) Nigel de Jong	2
9.	(Netherlands) Ryan Babel	2
12.	(Netherlands) Urby Emanuelson	1
12.	(Czech Republic) Zdeněk Grygera	1
12.	(Netherlands) Michael Timisela	1
12.	(Netherlands) John Heitinga	1
Own goals	(Sweden) Daniel Majstorović (Twente)	1
Total		66

KNVB Cup

Nr.	Name	Goal
1.	(Netherlands) Klaas-Jan Huntelaar	5
2.	(Netherlands) Wesley Sneijder	2
2.	(Netherlands) Ryan Babel	2
4.	(Greece) Angelos Charisteas	1
4.	(Morocco) Nourdin Boukhari	1
4.	(Belgium) Thomas Vermaelen	1
4.	(Argentina) Mauro Rosales	1
4.	(Netherlands) Urby Emanuelson	1
Own goals	(Netherlands) Frank Demouge (FC Eindhoven)	1
Total		15

UEFA Champions League

Nr.	Name	Goal
1.	(Netherlands) Wesley Sneijder	4
2.	(Greece) Yannis Anastasiou	3
2.	(Netherlands) Nigel de Jong	3
4.	(Sweden) Markus Rosenberg	2
4.	(Netherlands) Ryan Babel	2
6.	(Morocco) Nourdin Boukhari	1
6.	(Netherlands) Klaas-Jan Huntelaar	1
6.	(Argentina) Mauro Rosales	1
Total		17

== Placements ==
	Friendlies	Amsterdam Tournament	Johan Cruijff Schaal	KNVB Cup	UEFA Champions League	Eredivisie
Status	11 played, 10 wins, 1 draw, 0 losses	4th place	Winners; Last opponent: PSV	Winners; Last opponent: PSV	Eliminated in Round of 32; Last opponent: Internazionale	4th place 60 points in 34 matches qualified for UEFA Champions League; Qualifying rounds

- Klaas-Jan Huntelaar finishes as top-scorer of the Eredivisie with 33 goals in 34 matches. (17 with Heerenveen / 16 with Ajax)
- Klaas-Jan Huntelaar is voted Player of the Year by the supporters of Ajax.
- Urby Emanuelson and Thomas Vermaelen are voted Talent of the Year by the supporters of Ajax.

== Results ==
All times are in CEST

=== Johan Cruijff Schaal ===
5 August 2005	PSV	1–2	Ajax	Amsterdam
18:00 CET	Bouma 51'		Boukhari 72'; Babel 78'	Stadium: Amsterdam Arena; Attendance: 32,000; Referee: Jan Wegereef

=== Eredivisie ===
14 August 2005 1	Ajax	0-0	ADO Den Haag	Amsterdam
14:30		Match rescheduled for 21 September 2005		Stadium: Amsterdam Arena; Attendance: - Referee: -

20 August 2005 2	RBC Roosendaal	0–2	Ajax	Roosendaal
18:30		Report	Pienaar 59'; Rosenberg 85'	Stadium: RBC Stadion; Attendance: 5,000; Referee: Reinold Wiedemeijer

28 August 2005 3	Ajax	1–2	Feyenoord	Amsterdam
11:30	Charisteas 79'	Report	Kalou 16'; Kuyt 47'	Stadium: Amsterdam Arena; Attendance: 49,567; Referee: Dick van Egmond

10 September 2005 4	Willem II	0–2	Ajax	Tilburg
18:30		Report	Galásek 34'; Grygera (yellow card) 60' (red card); Charisteas 86'	Stadium: Koning Willem II Stadion; Attendance: 11,000; Referee: Ben Haverkort

18 September 2005 5	AZ	4–2	Ajax	Alkmaar
11:30	Arveladze 35', 37'; Perez 56', 58'	Report	Sneijder 10', 47'; Lindenbergh (yellow card) 88' (red card)	Stadium: Alkmaarderhout; Attendance: 8,747; Referee: Roelof Luinge

21 September 2005 1	Ajax	2–2	ADO Den Haag	Amsterdam
19:15	Maduro 20'; Sneijder 28'; Heitinga (yellow card) 63' (yellow-red card)	Report	Elia 90'; Saeijs 90'	Stadium: Amsterdam Arena; Attendance: 42,854; Referee: Eric Braamhaar

24 September 2005 6	Ajax	4–1	Roda JC	Amsterdam
19:15	Charisteas 27', 40'; Pienaar 69'; Galásek 86' (pen.)	Report	Eddy Sonko 81'	Stadium: Amsterdam Arena; Attendance: 45,856; Referee: René Temmink

2 October 2005 7	Sparta Rotterdam	1–2	Ajax	Rotterdam
11:30	Polak 52'	Report	De Jong 63', 77'	Stadium: Het Kasteel; Attendance: 11,000; Referee: Ruud Bossen

15 October 2005 8	Ajax	0–0	Heracles Almelo	Amsterdam
19:15		Report		Stadium: Amsterdam Arena; Attendance: 47,650; Referee: Tom van Sichem

23 October 2005 9	PSV	1–0	Ajax	Eindhoven
11:30	Simons 10' (pen.)	Report		Stadium: Philips Stadion; Attendance: 34,700; Referee: Pieter Vink

28 October 2005 10	Ajax	0–0	Heerenveen	Amsterdam
19:30		Report		Stadium: Amsterdam Arena; Attendance: 47,364; Referee: Jack van Hulten

6 November 2005 11	N.E.C.	1–0	Ajax	Nijmegen
11:30	Denneboom 46'	Report		Stadium: Goffertstadion; Attendance: 12,500; Referee: Jan Wegereef

19 November 2005 12	Ajax	2–0	Twente	Amsterdam
19:15	Majstorović 70' (o.g.); Rosenberg 90'	Report		Stadium: Amsterdam Arena; Attendance: 45,120; Referee: Reinold Wiedemeijer

27 November 2005 13	Utrecht	1–0	Ajax	Utrecht
11:30	Tiendalli 59'	Report		Stadium: Nieuw Galgenwaard; Attendance: 22,137; Referee: Johan Verbist

26 November 2005 14	Ajax	4–1	RKC Waalwijk	Amsterdam
11:30	Maduro 46'; Sneijder 48'; Rosenberg 84'; Babel 86'	Report	Hoogendorp 43'	Stadium: Amsterdam Arena; Attendance: 38,000; Referee: Ruud Bossen

11 December 2005 15	Vitesse	0–2	Ajax	Arnhem
13:30		Report	Galásek 17' (pen.); Charisteas 75'	Stadium: GelreDome; Attendance: 24,400; Referee: Pieter Vink

18 December 2005 16	NAC Breda	0–2	Ajax	Breda
13:30		Report	Rosenberg 39'; Sneijder 80'	Stadium: Rat Verlegh Stadion; Attendance: 12,395; Referee: Dick Jol

27 December 2005 17	Ajax	3–2	Groningen	Amsterdam
19:00	Rosenberg 7'; Charisteas 18', 67'	Report	Salmon 80'; Levchenko 89'	Stadium: Amsterdam Arena; Attendance: 48,547; Referee: Rien Koopman

30 December 2005 18	Heerenveen	4–2	Ajax	Heerenveen
19:00	Samaras 35', 76'; Huntelaar 38'; Hanssen 67'; Bosvelt (yellow card) 90' (yellow-red card)	Report	Vermaelen 79'; Galásek 90' (pen.)	Stadium: Abe Lenstra Stadion; Attendance: 21,000; Referee: Reinold Wiedemeijer

15 January 2006 19	Ajax	1–1	N.E.C.	Amsterdam
13:30	Rosenberg 12'	Report	Wielaert 6'	Stadium: Amsterdam Arena; Attendance: 48,000; Referee: Ruud Bossen

22 January 2006 20	Twente	2–3	Ajax	Enschede
11:30	Nkufo 25', 52'	Report	Rosenberg 51'; Maduro 89'; Emanuelson 90'	Stadium: Arke Stadion; Attendance: 13,250; Referee: Jan Wegereef

29 January 2006 21	Ajax	1–4	Utrecht	Amsterdam
13:30	Rosenberg 46'	Report	Ramzi 2', 48', 86'; Nelisse 89' (pen.)	Stadium: Amsterdam Arena; Attendance: 45,000; Referee: Dick Jol

5 February 2006 22	Feyenoord	3–2	Ajax	Rotterdam
11:30	Hofs 21'; Castelen 46'; Kuyt 48'	Report	Rosenberg 23'; Huntelaar 90'	Stadium: Feyenoord Stadion; Attendance: 45,000; Referee: René Temmink

8 February 2006 23	Ajax	1–0	Willem II	Amsterdam
19:15	Rosenberg 55'	Report		Stadium: Amsterdam Arena; Attendance: 37,000; Referee: Dick van Egmond

12 February 2006 24	ADO Den Haag	1–2	Ajax	The Hague
11:30	Mols 33'	Report	Grygera 30'; Huntelaar 55'	Stadium: Zuiderpark Stadion; Attendance: 9,133; Referee: Roelof Luinge

19 February 2006 25	Ajax	6–0	RBC Roosendaal	Amsterdam
13:30	Huntelaar 4', 71', 78', 83'; Rosenberg 28', 86'	Report		Stadium: Amsterdam Arena; Attendance: 46,383; Referee: Bas Nijhuis

26 February 2006 26	Heracles Almelo	1–3	Ajax	Almelo
13:30	Sluijter 19'	Report	Huntelaar 45'; Timisela 82'; Babel 90'	Stadium: Polman Stadion; Attendance: 8,500; Referee: Reinold Wiedemeijer

5 March 2006 27	Ajax	6–0	Sparta Rotterdam	Amsterdam
13:30	Boukhari 5', 14'; Huntelaar 40', 53', 56', 62'	Report		Stadium: Amsterdam Arena; Attendance: 47,476; Referee: Björn Kuipers

11 March 2006 28	Ajax	0–0	PSV	Amsterdam
13:30		Report		Stadium: Amsterdam Arena; Attendance: 48,741; Referee: Ben Haverkort

19 March 2006 29	Groningen	3–2	Ajax	Groningen
13:30	Levchenko 13' (pen.); Nevland 47'; Van der Linden 71'	Report	Huntelaar 17'; Vermaelen 68'	Stadium: Euroborg; Attendance: 19,814; Referee: Kevin Blom

26 March 2006 30	Ajax	1–1	NAC Breda	Amsterdam
13:30	Huntelaar 2'	Report	Mendes da Silva 80'	Stadium: Amsterdam Arena; Attendance: 47,700; Referee: Dick Jol

8 April 2006 31	Roda JC	2–1	Ajax	Kerkrade
13:30	Lindenbergh 27' (o.g.); Sonko 89'	Report	Klaas-Jan Huntelaar 18'; Juanfran (yellow card) 78' (red card)	Stadium: Parkstad Limburg Stadion; Attendance: 16.200; Referee: Roelof Luinge

9 April 2006 32	Ajax	1–0	AZ	Amsterdam
19:30	Boukhari 33'	Report		Stadium: Amsterdam Arena; Attendance: 50,150; Referee: Pieter Vink

12 April 2006 33	Ajax	2–1	Vitesse Arnhem	Amsterdam
19:00	Huntelaar 89'; Charisteas 93'	Report	Hersi 62'	Stadium: Amsterdam Arena; Attendance: 46,686; Referee: Dick van Egmond

29 April 2006 34	RKC Waalwijk	2–4	Ajax	Waalwijk
13:30	Lurling 18'; Keller (yellow card) 43' (yellow-red card); Peters 90'	Report	Heitinga 26'; Huntelaar 44' (pen.), 87'; Boukhari 50'	Stadium: Mandemakers Stadion; Attendance: 7,400; Referee: Jack van Hulten

=== Play-offs ===
First round

20 April 2006 First leg	Ajax	3–0	Feyenoord	Amsterdam
19:15	Rosales 27'; Pienaar (yellow card) 75' (red card); Heitinga 79'; Huntelaar 80'	Report	Bahia (yellow card) 61' (yellow-red card); Castelen (yellow card) 84' (red card)	Stadium: Amsterdam Arena; Attendance: 34,364; Referee: Eric Braamhaar

23 April 2006 Second leg	Feyenoord	2–4 (2–7 agg.)	Ajax	Rotterdam
11:30	Kuyt 59', 87'	Report	Rosales 34'; Huntelaar 40'; Boukhari 51'; Mitea 81'	Stadium: Feyenoord Stadion; Attendance: 30,470; Referee: Ruud Bossen

Second round

26 April 2006 First leg	Ajax	2–0	Groningen	Amsterdam
19:15	Rosenberg 9'; Charisteas 69'	Report		Stadium: Amsterdam Arena; Attendance: 38,060; Referee: Jan Wegereef

3 May 2006 Second leg	Groningen	2–1 (2–3 agg.)	Ajax	Groningen
18:00	Nevland 43'; Silva 61'; Buijs (yellow card) 90' (red card)	Report	Sneijder 88'; Boukhari (yellow card) 90' (red card)	Stadium: Euroborg; Attendance: 19,634; Referee: Ben Haverkort

=== KNVB Cup ===
22 December 2005 Round of 16	FC Eindhoven	1–6	Ajax	Eindhoven
23:00	Stojanović 69'		Charisteas 4'; Sneijder 14', 62'; Demouge 16' (o.g.); Boukhari 19'; Vermaelen 81'	Stadium: Jan Louwers Stadion; Attendance: 4,300; Referee: Kevin Blom

2 February 2006 Quarter-finals	Heerenveen	0–3	Ajax	Heerenveen
23:00			Rosales 9'; Huntelaar 89'; Emanuelson 90'	Stadium: Abe Lenstra Stadion; Attendance: 20,500; Referee: Ben Haverkort

22 March 2006 Semi-finals	Ajax	4 − 1 (a.e.t.)	Roda JC	Amsterdam
23:00	Huntelaar 90', 109'; Babel 94', 106'		Oper 61'	Stadium: Amsterdam Arena; Attendance: 26,449; Referee: Eric Brramhaar

7 May 2006 Final	Ajax	2–1	PSV	Rotterdam
19:45	Huntelaar 48', 90'; Galásek (yellow card) 42' (yellow-red card) 64'		Lamey 53'; Lamey (yellow card) 53' (yellow-red card) 70'	Stadium: Feyenoord Stadion; Attendance: 50,000; Referee: Pieter Vink

=== UEFA Champions League ===
Play-off round

10 August 2005 First leg	Brøndby (Denmark)	2–2	(Netherlands) Ajax	Copenhagen, Denmark
18:00	Skoubo 33'; Escudé 90' (o.g.)	Report	Rosenberg 30'; Babel 73'	Stadium: Brøndby Stadium; Attendance: 24,917; Referee: Massimo De Santis (Italy)

24 August 2005 Second leg	Ajax (Netherlands)	3–1 (5–3 agg.)	(Denmark) Brøndby	Amsterdam
19:30	Babel 50'; Sneijder 80', 88'	Report	Elmander 44'	Stadium: Amsterdam Arena; Attendance: 39,075; Referee: Markus Merk (Germany)

==== Group stage ====
Pos	Team	Pld	W	D	L	GF	GA	GD	Pts	Qualification	ARS	AJX	THU	SPP
1	(England) Arsenal	6	5	1	0	10	2	+8	16	Advance to knockout stage	—	0–0	2–1	3–0
2	(Netherlands) Ajax	6	3	2	1	10	6	+4	11	Advance to knockout stage	1–2	—	2–0	2–1
3	(Switzerland) Thun	6	1	1	4	4	9	−5	4	Transfer to UEFA Cup	0–1	2–4	—	1–0
4	(Czech Republic) Sparta Prague	6	0	2	4	2	9	−7	2		0–2	1–1	0–0	—

Source: RSSSF

14 September 2005 1	Sparta Prague (Czech Republic)	1–1	(Netherlands) Ajax	Prague, Czech Republic
19:45	Matušovič 66'	Report	Sneijder 90'	Stadium: Stadion Juliska; Attendance: 20.000; Referee: Claus Bo Larsen (Denmark)

27 September 2005 2	Ajax (Netherlands)	1–2	(England) Arsenal	Amsterdam
19:45	Rosenberg 71'	Report	Ljungberg 2'; Pires 69' (pen.)	Stadium: Amsterdam Arena; Attendance: 51.000; Referee: Luis Medina Cantalejo (Spain)

18 October 2005 3	Ajax (Netherlands)	2–0	(Switzerland) Thun	Amsterdam
19:45	Anastasiou 36', 55'	Report		Stadium: Amsterdam Arena; Attendance: 44,772; Referee: Roberto Rosetti (Italy)

2 November 2005 4	Thun (Switzerland)	2–4	(Netherlands) Ajax	Bern, Switzerland
19:45	Lustrinelli 56'; Pimenta 74'	Report	Sneijder 27'; Anastasiou 63'; De Jong 90'; Boukhari 90'	Stadium: Stade de Suisse; Attendance: 30.919; Referee: Vladimir Hrinak (Slovakia)

22 November 2005 5	Ajax (Netherlands)	2–1	(Czech Republic) Sparta Prague	Amsterdam
19:45	De Jong 68', 89'	Report	Petráš 90'	Stadium: Amsterdam Arena; Attendance: 46.158; Referee: Valentin Ivanov ((Russia))

7 December 2005 6	Arsenal (England)	0–0	(Netherlands) Ajax	London, England
19:45		Report		Stadium: Highbury; Attendance: 35.376; Referee: Eduardo Iturralde González ((Spain))

==== Knockout stage ====
===== Round of 16 =====
22 February 2006 1st Leg	Ajax (Netherlands)	2–2	(Italy) Internazionale	Amsterdam
19:45	Huntelaar 16'; Rosales 20'	Report	Stanković 49'; Cruz 86'	Stadium: Amsterdam Arena; Attendance: 46,663; Referee: Wolfgang Stark (Germany)

14 March 2006 2nd Leg	Internazionale (Italy)	1–0 (3–2 agg.)	(Netherlands) Ajax	Milan, Italy
21:05	Stanković 57'	Report		Stadium: San Siro; Attendance: 49,900; Referee: Peter Fröjdfeldt (Sweden)

=== Amsterdam Tournament ===
29 July 2005	Ajax (Netherlands)	0–1	(England) Arsenal	Amsterdam
21:15		Report	Lupoli 87'	Stadium: Amsterdam Arena; Attendance: 35,000; Referee: Dick van Egmond

31 July 2005	Ajax (Netherlands)	0–1	(Argentina) Boca Juniors	Amsterdam
21:15		Report	Calvo 41'	Stadium: Amsterdam Arena; Attendance: - Referee: Paul Allaerts

Final standings of the LG Amsterdam Tournament 2005

Team	Pld	W	D	L	GF	Pts
(England) Arsenal	2	2	0	0	3	9
(Portugal) Porto	2	1	0	1	3	6
(Argentina) Boca Juniors	2	1	0	1	1	4
(Netherlands) Ajax	2	0	0	2	0	0

=== Friendlies ===
9 July 2005	DWV (Netherlands)	0–7	(Netherlands) Ajax	Amsterdam, Netherlands
15:00		Report	Sneijder 50', 79'; Anastasiou 53', 54', 89'; Mitea 56', 89'	Stadium: Spieringhorn; Attendance: - Referee: -

11 July 2005	WHC (Netherlands)	3–4	(Netherlands) Ajax	Wezep, Netherlands
18:45	De Weerdt 12'; Füchten 14'; Buitenhuis 40'	Report	Anastasiou 7'; Lindgren 23'; De Mul 34'; Boukhari 90'	Stadium: Sportpark Mulderssingel; Attendance: 7,000; Referee: -

12 July 2005	Quick '20 (Netherlands)	0–4	(Netherlands) Ajax	Oldenzaal, Netherlands
19:30		Report	Boukhari 3'; Mitea 34'; De Jong 43'; Grygera 82'	Stadium: Sportpark de Vondersweijde; Attendance: 4,000; Referee: -

14 July 2005	HHC Hardenberg (Netherlands)	1–5	(Netherlands) Ajax	Hardenberg, Netherlands
19:30	Buitenhuis 9'	Report	Galásek 54' (pen.); Rosenberg 57'; De Ridder 76'; De Jong 86'; Mitea 90'	Stadium: De Boshoek; Attendance: 4,500; Referee: -

16 July 2005	Rijnsburgse Boys (Netherlands)	0–12	(Netherlands) Ajax	Rijnsburg, Netherlands
15:00		Report	Rosenberg 21', 35', 42'; Escudé 32' (pen.), 52' (pen.); Lindgren 34'; De Ridder 37', 74'; Boukhari 38'; De Jong 56', 76'; Anastasiou 84'	Stadium: Sportpark Eikelhof; Attendance: 4,500; Referee: Dennis van Aken

20 July 2005	Fortuna Sittard (Netherlands)	2–3	(Netherlands) Ajax	Sittard, Netherlands
19:30	Dassen 49'; Daemen 63'	Report	Mitea 20'; De Jong 42'; Anastasiou 61'	Stadium: Trendwork Arena; Attendance: 8,500; Referee: -

23 July 2005	Arminia Bielefeld (Germany)	0–4	(Netherlands) Ajax	Bielefeld, Germany
18:00			Sneijder 26'; Babel 35'; Rosenberg 55'; Heitinga 79'	Stadium: Bielefelder Alm; Attendance: 10,500; Referee: -

3 August 2005	Ajax (Netherlands)	3–0	(Netherlands) FC Omniworld	Amsterdam, Netherlands
15:30	Anastasiou 18'; De Jong 24'; De Ridder 25'	Report		Stadium: Amsterdam Arena; Attendance: 20,000

11 January 2006	HFC Haarlem (Netherlands)	0–0	(Netherlands) Ajax	Haarlem, Netherlands
20:00		Report		Stadium: Haarlem Stadion; Attendance: 3,000; Referee: -

20 May 2006	FC Hilversum (Netherlands)	0–10	(Netherlands) Ajax	Hilversum, Netherlands
16:00		Report	Mitea 1', 23'; Vertonghen 2', 57'; Anastasiou 10'; Boukhari 27', 35'; Martina 37', 51'; Boerrigter 85'	Stadium: Sportpark Crailoo; Attendance: - Referee: -

23 May 2006	VV Hierden (Netherlands)	1–10	(Netherlands) Ajax	Hierden, Netherlands
23:00	van den Hul 21'	Report	Mitea 5', 10', 41'; Martina 30'; Anastasiou 36', 39'; Poepon 79'; Boerrigter 83'; Boukhari 85'; Severein 89' (o.g.)	Stadium: Sportpark Mheenzicht; Attendance: - Referee: -

== Transfers ==
=== Summer ===
For a list of all Dutch football transfers in the summer window (1 July 2005 to 1 September 2005) please see List of Dutch football transfers summer 2005.

==== In ====
- The following players moved to AFC Ajax.

	Name	Position	Transfer type	Previous club	Fee
	Return from loan spell				
Substituted on	(Nigeria) Pius Ikedia	Forward	1 July 2005	(Netherlands) RBC Roosendaal	-
Substituted on	(Belgium) Thomas Vermaelen	Defender	1 July 2005	(Netherlands) RKC Waalwijk	-
Substituted on	(Ghana) Abubakari Yakubu	Defender	1 July 2005	(Netherlands) Vitesse	-
	Loan				
Substituted on	(Spain) Juanfran	Defender	1 July 2005	(Turkey) Beşiktaş	-
	Transfer				
Substituted on	(Sweden) Markus Rosenberg	Forward	6 June 2005	(Sweden) Malmö FF	€5.3M
Substituted on	(Netherlands) Olaf Lindenbergh	Midfielder	9 June 2005	(Netherlands) AZ	€1.2M
	Free Transfer				
Substituted on	(Armenia) Edgar Manucharyan	Forward	15 April 2005	(Armenia) Pyunik	-

==== Out ====
- The following players moved from AFC Ajax.

	Name	Position	Transfer type	New club	Fee
	Out on loan				
Substituted off	(Sweden) Rasmus Lindgren	Midfielder	9 August 2005	(Netherlands) Groningen	-
Substituted off	(Belgium) Tom de Mul	Midfielder	24 August 2005	(Netherlands) Vitesse	-
	Loan return				
Substituted off	(Brazil) Filipe Luís	Defender	1 July 2005	(Brazil) Figueirense	-
Substituted off	(Argentina) Gastón Sangoy	Forward	1 July 2005	(Argentina) Boca Juniors	-
	Transfer				
Substituted off	(Netherlands) Rafael van der Vaart	Midfielder	1 June 2005	(Germany) Hamburg	€5.5M
Substituted off	(Belgium) Wesley Sonck	Forward	1 July 2005	(Germany) Borussia Mönchengladbach	€2.5M
Substituted off	(Ghana) Abubakari Yakubu	Midfielder	1 July 2005	(Netherlands) Vitesse	€0.75M
Substituted off	(Netherlands) Daniël de Ridder	Midfielder	31 August 2005	(Spain) Celta Vigo	?
	Free				
Substituted off	(Nigeria) Pius Ikedia	Forward	1 July 2005	(Netherlands) AZ	-
Substituted off	(Netherlands) Ruud Kras	Defender	13 July 2005	(Netherlands) Dordrecht	-
Substituted off	(Ghana) Anthony Obodai	Midfielder	30 August 2005	(Netherlands) Sparta Rotterdam	-

=== Winter ===
For a list of all Dutch football transfers in the winter window (1 January 2006 to 1 February 2006) please see List of Dutch football transfers winter 2005–06.

==== In ====
- The following players moved to AFC Ajax.

	Name	Position	Transfer type	Previous club	Fee
	Return from loan spell				
Substituted on	(Netherlands) Victor Sikora	Midfielder	1 January 2006	(Netherlands) Heerenveen	-
	Transfer				
Substituted on	(Netherlands) Klaas-Jan Huntelaar	Forward	29 December 2005	(Netherlands) Heerenveen	€9M

==== Out ====
The following players moved from AFC Ajax.

	Name	Position	Transfer type	New club	Fee
	Out on loan				
Substituted off	(Belgium) Stanley Aborah	Midfielder	4 November 2005	(Netherlands) FC Den Bosch	-
Substituted off	(Netherlands) Victor Sikora	Midfielder	1 January 2006	(Netherlands) NAC Breda	-
	Transfer				
Substituted off	(France) Julien Escudé	Defender	18 January 2006	(Spain) Sevilla	€1.5M
Substituted off	(Romania) Bogdan Lobonţ	Goalkeeper	22 January 2006	(Italy) Fiorentina	€1.2M
Substituted off	(Netherlands) Nigel de Jong	Midfielder	26 January 2006	(Germany) Hamburg	€3.5M
	Free				
Substituted off	(Argentina) Sebastián Rusculleda	Midfielder	29 December 2005	(Argentina) Boca Juniors	-
Substituted off	(Brazil) Maxwell	Defender	2 January 2006	(Italy) Internazionale	-
