= 2004–05 AFC Ajax season =

Dutch football club season

AFC Ajax
2004–05 season
- Chairman: John Jaakke
- Manager: Ronald Koeman (until 25 February); Danny Blind
- Eredivisie: 2nd
- KNVB Cup: Semi-final
- Champions League: Group stage
- UEFA Cup: Round of 32
- Johan Cruijff Schaal: Runner-up
- Top goalscorer: League: Wesley Sneijder and Ryan Babel (7); All: Ryan Babel (9)
Home colours	Away colours	Third colours

During the 2004–05 season AFC Ajax participated in the Eredivisie, the KNVB Cup, the UEFA Champions League and the UEFA Cup.

== Pre-season ==
The first training session for the 2004–05 season was held on July 7, 2004. In preparation for the new season Ajax organized a training camp in De Lutte, Netherlands at the De Thij Sportpark. During the pre-season, the squad played friendly matches against FC Omniworld, DOS '19, Excelsior '31, HSV de Zuidvogels, Queens Park Rangers and Luton Town. They then returned to Amsterdam to play Panathinaikos and Arsenal in the annual Amsterdam Tournament.

== Player statistics ==
Appearances for competitive matches only

No.	Pos	Nat	Player	Total		Eredivisie		UEFA C.L.		KNVB Cup	
No.	Pos	Nat	Player	Apps	Goals	Apps	Goals	Apps	Goals	Apps	Goals
1	GK	(Romania) ROU	Bogdan Lobonţ	9	0	6+1	0	2	0	0	0
2	DF	(Tunisia) TUN	Hatem Trabelsi	32	0	24	0	6	0	2	0
3	DF	(Netherlands) NED	John Heitinga	35	1	23+3	1	6	0	3	0
4	DF	(France) FRA	Julien Escudé	37	5	26+2	5	4+2	0	3	0
5	DF	(Brazil) BRA	Maxwell	39	3	28+1	3	7	0	3	0
6	MF	(Czech Republic) CZE	Tomáš Galásek	16	3	11+2	2	3	1	0	0
7	FW	(Argentina) ARG	Mauro Rosales	30	6	20+2	5	6	0	2	1
8	MF	(South Africa) RSA	Steven Pienaar	30	4	21+3	4	4	0	1+1	0
9	FW	(Greece) GRE	Angelos Charisteas	16	5	12+1	4	0	0	2+1	1
10	MF	(Netherlands) NED	Rafael van der Vaart	31	7	20+2	6	6+1	1	2	0
12	MF	(Ghana) GHA	Anthony Obodai	19	0	6+7	0	4+1	0	1	0
16	MF	(Netherlands) NED	Nigel de Jong	41	6	26+5	5	8	1	1+1	0
17	FW	(Greece) GRE	Yannis Anastasiou	17	4	8+6	4	0+2	0	0+1	0
18	MF	(Netherlands) NED	Wesley Sneijder	40	8	25+5	7	6+1	0	3	1
20	FW	(Netherlands) NED	Daniël de Ridder	20	3	2+13	2	0+5	1	0	0
21	GK	(Netherlands) NED	Maarten Stekelenburg	16	0	10+1	0	4	0	1	0
23	DF	(Czech Republic) CZE	Zdeněk Grygera	25	4	18	4	5	0	2	0
25	DF	(Brazil) BRA	Filipe Luís	0	0	0	0	0	0	0	0
26	MF	(Netherlands) NED	Hedwiges Maduro	15	2	12	2	0+1	0	2	0
27	FW	(Belgium) BEL	Tom de Mul	7	1	6	1	0+1	0	0	0
28	MF	(Morocco) MAR	Nourdin Boukhari	30	4	16+7	4	3+3	0	1	0
29	FW	(Romania) ROU	Nicolae Mitea	29	3	10+11	2	4+2	1	2	0
30	FW	(Belgium) BEL	Stanley Aborah	7	0	0+4	0	1+2	0	0	0
31	GK	(South Africa) RSA	Hans Vonk	23	0	18+1	0	2	0	2	0
32	MF	(Netherlands Antilles) ANT	Vurnon Anita	0	0	0	0	0	0	0	0
35	MF	(Netherlands) NED	Urby Emanuelson	5	0	2+1	0	0+1	0	0+1	0
38	MF	(Sweden) SWE	Rasmus Lindgren	5	0	3+1	0	0+1	0	0	0
39	FW	(Argentina) ARG	Gastón Sangoy	0	0	0	0	0	0	0	0
45	DF	(Netherlands) NED	Michael Timisela	0	0	0	0	0	0	0	0
49	FW	(Netherlands) NED	Ryan Babel	27	9	13+7	7	4	1	1+2	1
56	MF	(Belgium) BEL	Jan Vertonghen	0	0	0	0	0	0	0	0
57	DF	(Netherlands) NED	Ruud Kras	0	0	0	0	0	0	0	0
58	MF	(Netherlands) NED	Donovan Slijngard	0	0	0	0	0	0	0	0
Players sold or loaned out after the start of the season:
9	FW	(Sweden) SWE	Zlatan Ibrahimović	3	3	3	3	0	0	0	0
11	FW	(Belgium) BEL	Tom Soetaers	0	0	0	0	0	0	0	0
15	DF	(United States) USA	John O'Brien	1	0	1	0	0	0	0	0
19	FW	(Belgium) BEL	Wesley Sonck	13	2	4+5	1	3+1	1	0	0
65	MF	(Argentina) ARG	Sebastián Rusculleda	0	0	0	0	0	0	0	0

=== 2004–05 selection by nationality ===
Nationality	(Netherlands)	(Belgium)	(Brazil)	(Czech Republic)	(Greece)	(Romania)	(South Africa)	(Argentina)	(Ghana)	(France)	(Morocco)	(Tunisia)	(Netherlands Antilles)	(Sweden)	Total Players
Current squad selection	7	2	2	2	2	2	2	1	1	1	1	1	-	-	24
Youth/reserves squad in AFC Ajax selection	5	1	-	-	-	-	-	1	-	-	-	-	1	1	9
Players out on loan	2	2	-	-	-	-	-	-	1	-	-	-	-	-	4

== Team statistics ==
=== Eredivisie standings ===
Standing	Matches played	Wins	Draws	Losses	Points	Goals for	Goals against	Yellow cards (yellow card)	Red cards (red card)
2	34	24	5	5	77	50	33	41	0

==== Points by match day ====
Match day	1	2	3	4	5	6	7	8	9	10	11	12	13	14	15	16	17	18	19	20	21	22	23	24	25	26	27	28	29	30	31	32	33	34	Total
Points	3	3	1	1	3	3	1	0	0	3	3	1	3	3	3	3	3	3	1	0	3	3	3	3	3	0	0	3	3	3	3	3	3	3	77

==== Total points by match day ====
Match day	1	2	3	4	5	6	7	8	9	10	11	12	13	14	15	16	17	18	19	20	21	22	23	24	25	26	27	28	29	30	31	32	33	34	Total
Points	3	6	7	8	11	14	15	15	15	18	21	22	25	28	31	34	37	40	41	41	44	47	50	53	56	56	56	59	62	65	68	71	74	77	77

==== Standing by match day ====
Match day	1	2	3	4	5	6	7	8	9	10	11	12	13	14	15	16	17	18	19	20	21	22	23	24	25	26	27	28	29	30	31	32	33	34	Standing
Standing	6th	3rd	3rd	3rd	2nd	2nd	4th	4th	6th	5th	4th	4th	4th	3rd	3rd	3rd	3rd	3rd	3rd	3rd	3rd	3rd	3rd	3rd	3rd	3rd	3rd	3rd	2nd	2nd	2nd	2nd	2nd	2nd	2nd

==== Goals by match day ====
Match day	1	2	3	4	5	6	7	8	9	10	11	12	13	14	15	16	17	18	19	20	21	22	23	24	25	26	27	28	29	30	31	32	33	34	Total
Goals	3	6	1	3	5	1	0	1	0	1	3	1	5	4	2	1	4	2	0	1	2	2	2	4	1	0	1	2	3	1	4	4	2	2	50

=== Statistics for the 2004–05 season ===
- This is an overview of all the statistics for played matches in the 2004–05 season.

	Friendlies	Amsterdam Tournament	Johan Cruijff Schaal	KNVB Cup	UEFA Champions League	UEFA Cup	Eredivisie	Total
Matches	10	2	1	3	6	2	34	58
Wins	8	1	0	2	1	1	24	37
Draws	1	1	0	0	1	0	5	8
Losses	1	0	1	1	4	1	5	13
Home	1	2	1	1	3	1	17	26
Away	9	0	0	2	3	1	17	32
Yellow cards (yellow card)	6	2	3	7	14	54	4	90
Red cards (red card)	0	0	0	1	0	5	2	8
2 x yellow in 1 match (yellow card) (yellow-red card)	0	0	0	1	0	2	0	3
Number of substitutes used (substituted on) (substituted off)	50	5	2	10	23	85	8	177
Goals for	62	0	2	15	17	66	10	172
Goals against	7	2	1	3	12	41	4	70
Balance	+55	-2	+1	+12	+5	+25	+6	+102
Clean sheets	7	0	0	1	2	12	2	24
Penalties for	3	0	0	0	0	3	0	6
Penalties against	0	0	0	0	1	3	0	4

=== 2004–05 team records ===
Description	Competition	Result
Biggest win	(Netherlands) Friendly match	DOS '19 – AFC Ajax (0–15)
Biggest win	(Netherlands) KNVB Cup	AFC Ajax – SC Heerenveen (2–0)
Biggest win	(European Union) UEFA Champions League	AFC Ajax – Maccabi Tel Aviv (2–0)
Biggest win	(European Union) UEFA Cup	AFC Ajax – AJ Auxerre (1–0)
Biggest win	(Netherlands) Eredivisie	FC Den Bosch – AFC Ajax (5–0); De Graafschap – AFC Ajax (5–0)
Biggest loss	(Spain) Friendly match	FC Barcelona – AFC Ajax (2–1)
Biggest loss	(Netherlands) KNVB Cup	Willem II – AFC Ajax (1–0)
Biggest loss	(European Union) UEFA Champions League	Bayern München – AFC Ajax (4–0)
Biggest loss	(European Union) UEFA Cup	AJ Auxerre – AFC Ajax (3–1)
Biggest loss	(Netherlands) Eredivisie	AFC Ajax – PSV (0–4)
Most goals in a match	(Netherlands) Friendly match	DOS '19 – AFC Ajax (0–15)
Most goals in a match	(Netherlands) KNVB Cup	AFC Ajax – SC Heerenveen (2–0); ADO Den Haag – AFC Ajax (0–2)
Most goals in a match	(European Union) UEFA Champions League	Bayern München – AFC Ajax (4–0)
Most goals in a match	(European Union) UEFA Cup	AJ Auxerre – AFC Ajax (3–1)
Most goals in a match	(Netherlands) Eredivisie	AFC Ajax – NAC Breda (6–2)

==== Top scorers ====
Friendlies

Nr.	Name	Goal
1	(Greece) Yannis Anastasiou	14
2	(Belgium) Wesley Sonck	6
3	(Romania) Nicolae Mitea	5
3	(Sweden) Rasmus Lindgren	5
5	(Belgium) Tom de Mul	4
5	(Brazil) Maxwell	4
7	(Netherlands) Nigel de Jong	2
7	(Netherlands) Daniël de Ridder	2
7	(South Africa) Steven Pienaar	2
10	(Belgium) Tom Soetaers	1
10	(Finland) Petri Pasanen	1
10	(Ghana) Anthony Obodai	1
10	(Netherlands) Hedwiges Maduro	1
10	(Netherlands) Victor Sikora	1
10	(Greece) Angelos Charisteas	1
10	(France) Julien Escudé	1
Total		51

Johan Cruijff Schaal

Nr.	Name	Goal
1	(South Africa) Steven Pienaar	1
1	(Netherlands) Wesley Sneijder	1
Total		2

Eredivisie

Nr.	Name	Goal
1	(Netherlands) Wesley Sneijder	7
1	(Netherlands) Ryan Babel	7
3	(Netherlands) Rafael van der Vaart	6
4	(Netherlands) Nigel de Jong	5
4	(Argentina) Mauro Rosales	5
4	(France) Julien Escudé	5
7	(South Africa) Steven Pienaar	4
7	(Czech Republic) Zdeněk Grygera	4
7	(Morocco) Nourdin Boukhari	4
7	(Greece) Yannis Anastasiou	4
7	(Greece) Angelos Charisteas	4
12	(Sweden) Zlatan Ibrahimović	3
12	(Brazil) Maxwell	3
14	(Czech Republic) Tomáš Galásek	2
14	(Netherlands) Daniël de Ridder	2
14	(Romania) Nicolae Mitea	2
14	(Netherlands) Hedwiges Maduro	2
18	(Belgium) Tom de Mul	1
18	(Netherlands) John Heitinga	1
18	(Belgium) Wesley Sonck	1
Own goals	(Netherlands) Mike Zonneveld (NAC Breda)	1
Own goals	(Netherlands) Dave Bus (De Graafschap)	1
Total		74

UEFA Champions League

Nr.	Name	Goal
1	(Belgium) Wesley Sonck	1
1	(Netherlands) Nigel de Jong	1
1	(Netherlands) Rafael van der Vaart	1
1	(Netherlands) Daniël de Ridder	1
1	(Czech Republic) Tomáš Galásek	1
1	(Romania) Nicolae Mitea	1
Total		6

KNVB Cup

Nr.	Name	Goal
1	(Greece) Angelos Charisteas	1
1	(Netherlands) Ryan Babel	1
1	(Netherlands) Wesley Sneijder	1
1	(Argentina) Mauro Rosales	1
Total		4

UEFA Cup

Nr.	Name	Goal
1	(Brazil) Maxwell	1
1	(Netherlands) Ryan Babel	1
Total		2

Amsterdam Tournament

Nr.	Name	Goal
1	(Belgium) Wesley Sonck	2
2	(Sweden) Zlatan Ibrahimović	1
Total		3

== Placements ==
	Friendlies	Amsterdam Tournament	Johan Cruijff Schaal	KNVB Cup	UEFA Champions League	UEFA Cup	Eredivisie
Status	10 played, 8 wins, 1 draw, 1 loss	Winners	Runner-up; Last opponent: FC Utrecht	Semifinals; Last opponent: Willem II	3rd place in Group C Placement for: UEFA Cup	Eliminated in Round of 32; Last opponent: Auxerre	2nd place 77 points in 34 matches qualified for UEFA Champions League; Qualifying rounds

- Nigel de Jong is voted Player of the year by the supporters of Ajax.
- Wesley Sneijder is voted Talent of the year by the supporters of Ajax.

== Results ==
All times are in CEST

=== Johan Cruijff Schaal ===
8 August 2004	Ajax	2–4	Utrecht	Amsterdam
18:00 CET	Pienaar 51'; Sneijder 80'	Report	Schut 72'; Somers 87', 90'; Douglas 95'	Stadium: Amsterdam Arena; Attendance: 33,500; Referee: Dick van Egmond

=== Eredivisie ===
15 August 2004 1	Twente	2–3	Ajax	Enschede
11:30	Touzani 48'; Nkufo 66'	Report	De Mul 30'; Van der Vaart 40'; Ibrahimović 46'	Stadium: Arke Stadion; Attendance: 13,250; Referee: Ruud Bossen

22 August 2004 2	Ajax	6–2	NAC Breda	Amsterdam
13:30	Ibrahimović 13', 76'; Zonneveld 41' (o.g.); Heitinga 51'; Sneijder 70'; Maxwell 86'	Report	Cornelisse 11'; Slot 82'	Stadium: Amsterdam Arena; Attendance: 46,124; Referee: Jan Wegereef

29 August 2004 3	Ajax	1–1	Utrecht	Amsterdam
13:30	Pienaar 62'	Report	Douglas 20'	Stadium: Amsterdam Arena; Attendance: 46,932; Referee: Roelof Luinge

12 September 2004 4	ADO Den Haag	3–3	Ajax	The Hague
11:30	Van der Gun 44'; Den Ouden 68' (pen.); Stroeve 83'	Report	Sonck 7'; Pienaar 14'; Boukhari 31'	Stadium: Zuiderpark Stadion; Attendance: 9,000; Referee: Ben Haverkort

19 September 2004 5	Den Bosch	0–5	Ajax	's-Hertogenbosch
11:30		Report	Sneijder 13'; Van der Vaart 41', 90'; Grygera 58'; De Jong 74'	Stadium: De Vliert; Attendance: 7.023; Referee: Dick van Egmond

25 September 2004 6	Ajax	1–0	Roda JC	Amsterdam
19:30	Anastasiou 88'	Report		Stadium: Amsterdam Arena; Attendance: 48.370; Referee: Pieter Vink

3 October 2004 7	AZ	0–0	Ajax	Alkmaar
11:30	Jaliens (red card)	Report		Stadium: Alkmaarder Hout; Attendance: 7,687; Referee: Jack van Hulten

16 October 2004 8	Ajax	1–3	Heerenveen	Amsterdam
19:15	Anastasiou 33'	Report	Yıldırım 53'; Väyrynen 61'; Selaković 86'	Stadium: Amsterdam Arena; Attendance: 49,214; Referee: Johan Verbist

24 October 2004 9	PSV	2–0	Ajax	Eindhoven
11:30	Lee 39'; De Jong 49'	Report		Stadium: Philips Stadion; Attendance: 35,000; Referee: Dick van Egmond

31 October 2004 10	Ajax	1–0	N.E.C.	Amsterdam
13:30	Van der Vaart 24'	Report		Stadium: Amsterdam Arena; Attendance: 46.345; Referee: Eric Braamhaar

7 November 2004 11	Willem II	1–3	Ajax	Tilburg
11:30	Grygera 13' (o.g.)	Report	Rosales 36', 43'; Maxwell 62'	Stadium: Koning Willem II Stadion; Attendance: 13,100; Referee: Jan Wegereef

14 November 2004 12	Ajax	1–1	Feyenoord	Amsterdam
11:30	Rosales 27'	Report	Kuyt 44'	Stadium: Amsterdam Arena; Attendance: 49.557; Referee: Pieter Vink

20 November 2004 13	De Graafschap	0–5	Ajax	Doetinchem
18:30		Report	Escudé 47', 65'; Bus 53' (o.g.); Babel 66'; Galásek 71'	Stadium: De Vijverberg; Attendance: 11.000; Referee: Dick Jol

28 November 2004 14	Ajax	4–1	RBC Roosendaal	Amsterdam
13:30	Anastasiou 13'; Maxwell 33'; Escudé 51'; Rosales 83'	Report	De Graaf 23'	Stadium: Amsterdam Arena; Attendance: 47,697; Referee: Peter van Dongen

3 December 2004 15	RKC Waalwijk	1–2	Ajax	Waalwijk
19:00	Fuchs 7'	Report	Sneijder 11'; Rosales 36'	Stadium: Mandemakers Stadion; Attendance: 7,200; Referee: René Temmink

12 December 2004 16	Ajax	1–0	Vitesse Arnhem	Amsterdam
13:30	Babel 88'	Report		Stadium: Amsterdam Arena; Attendance: 48,214; Referee: Tom van Sichem

19 December 2004 17	Groningen	0–4	Ajax	Groningen
13:30		Report	Sneijder 58'; Mitea 64'; Babel 74', 78'	Stadium: Euroborg; Attendance: 12,500; Referee: Reinold Wiedemeijer

23 January 2005 18	Utrecht	0–2	Ajax	Utrecht
11:30		Report	Sneijder 66'; Babel 90'	Stadium: Stadion Galgenwaard; Attendance: 22.600; Referee: Roelof Luinge

15 January 2005 19	Ajax	0–0	ADO Den Haag	Amsterdam
13:30		Report		Stadium: Amsterdam Arena; Attendance: 45,199; Referee: Ruud Bossen

6 February 2005 20	Ajax	1–2	Twente	Amsterdam
13:30	Escudé 6'	Report	Nkufo 36'; Touma 67'	Stadium: Amsterdam Arena; Attendance: 46,868; Referee: René Temmink

13 February 2005 21	NAC Breda	1–2	Ajax	Breda
11:30	Cornelisse 54'	Report	Boukhari 3', 88'	Stadium: Rat Verlegh Stadion; Attendance: 15,103; Referee: Pieter Vink

20 February 2005 22	Ajax	2–0	Den Bosch	Amsterdam
13:30	De Ridder 90'; Boukhari 90'	Report		Stadium: Amsterdam Arena; Attendance: 49,619; Referee: Jack van Hulten

27 February 2005 23	Roda JC	1–2	Ajax	Kerkrade
11:30	Rosenberg 55'	Report	Charisteas 33'; Escudé 42'	Stadium: Parkstad Limburg; Attendance: 17,500; Referee: Ben Haverkort

6 March 2005 24	Ajax	−	AZ	Amsterdam
14:30		Match rescheduled for 10 April 2005		Stadium: Amsterdam Arena; Attendance: - Referee: -

13 March 2005 25	N.E.C.	0–1	Ajax	Nijmegen
11:30		Report	Maduro 55'	Stadium: Stadion de Goffert; Attendance: 12,000; Referee: Joeri van de Velde

20 March 2005 26	Ajax	0–4	PSV	Amsterdam
11:30		Report	Cocu 24'; Van Bommel 45', 54' (pen.), 59'	Stadium: Amsterdam Arena; Attendance: 50,765; Referee: Eric Braamhaar

2 April 2005 27	Heerenveen	2–1	Ajax	Heerenveen
18:30	Seip 63'; Samaras 87'	Report	Charisteas 34'	Stadium: Abe Lenstra Stadion; Attendance: 21,000; Referee: Dick Jol

7 April 2005 28	Ajax	2–0	Willem II	Amsterdam
19:15	Mitea 20'; Babel 90'	Report		Stadium: Amsterdam Arena; Attendance: 45,216; Referee: Kevin Blom

10 April 2005 24	Ajax	4–2	AZ	Amsterdam
13:30	De Jong 19', 42'; Sneijder 51'; Pienaar 62'	Report	Nelisse 38'; Sektioui 86'	Stadium: Amsterdam Arena; Attendance: 49,882; Referee: Dick van Egmond

17 April 2005 29	Feyenoord	2–3	Ajax	Rotterdam
11:30	Kalou 48'; Kuyt 80'	Report	De Jong 57'; Grygera 86'; Maduro 90'	Stadium: Feyenoordstadion; Attendance: 43,000; Referee: René Temmink

24 April 2005 30	Ajax	1–0	De Graafschap	Amsterdam
13:30	Anastasiou 86'	Report	Kalezić (red card) 34'	Stadium: Amsterdam Arena; Attendance: 48,707; Referee: Fred Sterk

30 April 2005 31	RBC Roosendaal	1–4	Ajax	Roosendaal
17:30	Smolders 80'	Report	Pienaar 23'; Sneijder 38'; Charisteas 39'; Galásek 62' (pen.)	Stadium: Vast & Goed Stadion; Attendance: 5,000; Referee: Reinold Wiedemeijer

7 May 2005 32	Ajax	4–0	RKC Waalwijk	Amsterdam
18:30	Babel 34'; Grygera 37'; De Jong 77'; Charisteas 89'	Report		Stadium: Amsterdam Arena; Attendance: 48,672; Referee: Ben Haverkort

15 May 2005 33	Vitesse Arnhem	0–2	Ajax	Arnhem
13:30		Report	Grygera 56'; Van der Vaart 80'	Stadium: GelreDome; Attendance: 22,631; Referee: Eric Braamhaar

22 May 2005 34	Ajax	2–1	Groningen	Amsterdam
13:30	Van der Vaart 64'; De Ridder 77'	Report	Nevland 44'	Stadium: Amsterdam Arena; Attendance: 49,147; Referee: Tom van Sichem

=== KNVB Cup ===
27 January 2005 Round of 16	Ajax	2–0	Heerenveen	Amsterdam
20:45	Charisteas 88'; Babel 90'	Report		Stadium: Amsterdam Arena; Attendance: 35,000; Referee: Ben Haverkort

2 March 2005 Quarterfinals	ADO Den Haag	0–2	Ajax	The Hague
21:00		Report	Sneijder 54'; Rosales 90'	Stadium: Zuiderpark Stadion; Attendance: 6,000; Referee: Eric Brramhaar

21 April 2005 Semifinals	Willem II	1–0	Ajax	Tilburg
20:45	Caluwé 38'}	Report		Stadium: Willem II Stadion; Attendance: 14.500; Referee: Roelof Luinge

=== UEFA Champions League ===
==== Group stage ====
Pos	Team	Pld	W	D	L	GF	GA	GD	Pts	Qualification	JUV	BAY	AJX	MTA
1	(Italy) Juventus	6	5	1	0	6	1	+5	16	Advance to knockout stage	—	1–0	1–0	1–0
2	(Germany) Bayern Munich	6	3	1	2	12	5	+7	10	Advance to knockout stage	0–1	—	4–0	5–1
3	(Netherlands) Ajax	6	1	1	4	6	10	−4	4	Transfer to UEFA Cup	0–1	2–2	—	3–0
4	(Israel) Maccabi Tel Aviv	6	1	1	4	4	12	−8	4		1–1	0–1	2–1	—

15 September 2004 1	Ajax (Netherlands)	0–1	(Italy) Juventus	Amsterdam
19:45		Report	Nedvěd 42'	Stadium: Amsterdam Arena; Attendance: 50.000; Referee: Urs Meier (Switzerland)

28 September 2004 2	Bayern München (Germany)	4–0	(Netherlands) Ajax	Munich, Germany
19:45	Makaay 28', 43', 50'; Zé Roberto 54'	Report		Stadium: Olympiastadion; Attendance: 50.000; Referee: Alain Sars (France)

19 October 2004 3	Ajax (Netherlands)	3–0	(Israel) Maccabi Tel Aviv	Amsterdam
19:45	Sonck 5'; De Jong 21'; Van der Vaart 33'	Report		Stadium: Amsterdam Arena; Attendance: 48.161; Referee: Eduardo Iturralde González (Spain)

3 November 2004 4	Maccabi Tel Aviv (Israel)	2–1	(Netherlands) Ajax	Ramat Gan, Israel
19:45	Dego 49', 57'	Report	De Ridder 88'	Stadium: Ramat Gan Stadium; Attendance: 32,000; Referee: Vladimír Hriňák ((Slovakia))

23 November 2004 5	Juventus (Italy)	1–0	(Netherlands) Ajax	Turin, Italy
19:45	Zalayeta 15'	Report		Stadium: Stadio delle Alpi; Attendance: 6,865; Referee: Konrad Plautz (Austria)

8 December 2004 6	Ajax (Netherlands)	2–2	(Germany) Bayern München	Amsterdam
19:45	Galásek 39'; Mitea 64'	Report	Makaay 9'; Ballack 78'	Stadium: Amsterdam Arena; Attendance: 50,019; Referee: Lucílio Batista ((Portugal))

=== UEFA Cup ===
Round of 32

16 February 2005 1st leg	Ajax (Netherlands)	1–0	(France) Auxerre	Amsterdam
19:00	Maxwell 36'	Report		Stadium: Amsterdam Arena; Attendance: 42,319; Referee: Jaroslav Jára (Czech Republic)

24 February 2005 2nd leg	Auxerre (France)	3–1 (3–2 agg.)	(Netherlands) Ajax	Auxerre, France
19:45	Kalou 31'; Cheyrou 55'; Mathis 86'	Report	Babel 36'	Stadium: Stade de l'Abbé-Deschamps; Attendance: 18,000; Referee: Olegario Benquerenca (Portugal)

=== Amsterdam Tournament ===
30 July 2004	Ajax (Netherlands)	3–2	(Greece) Panathinaikos	Amsterdam
21:15	Ibrahimović 54'; Sonck 62', 64' (pen.)	Report	Maxwell 76' (o.g.); Konstantinou 82'	Stadium: Amsterdam Arena; Attendance: 30,000; Referee: Frank de Bleeckere

1 August 2004	Ajax (Netherlands)	0–0	(England) Arsenal	Amsterdam
21:15		Report		Stadium: Amsterdam Arena; Attendance: 52,000; Referee: René Temmink

Final standings of the LG Amsterdam Tournament 2004

Team	Pld	W	D	L	GF	Pts
(Netherlands) Ajax	2	1	1	0	3	7
(Argentina) River Plate	2	1	1	0	1	5
(Greece) Panathinaikos	2	0	0	2	2	2
(England) Arsenal	2	0	2	0	0	2

=== Friendlies ===
10 July 2004	FC Omniworld (Netherlands)	1–5	(Netherlands) Ajax	Almere, Netherlands
15:00	Çakır 27'	Report	De Jong 10'; Soetaers 17'; Pasanen 23'; De Mul 35'; Obodai 67'	Stadium: FBK-Sportpark; Attendance: 4,500; Referee: -

13 July 2004	DOS '19 (Netherlands)	0–15	(Netherlands) Ajax	Denekamp, Netherlands
18:45		Report	Lindgren 13'; Anastasiou 22', 72', 78', 83', 87'; De Ridder 27', 75'; Mitea 40', 43'; Sonck 50', 85', 90'; Maxwell 66'; De Mul 70'	Stadium: Sportpark De Molendijk; Attendance: 3,500; Referee: -

15 July 2004	Excelsior '31 (Netherlands)	1–9	(Netherlands) Ajax	Rijssen, Netherlands
19:30	Scheppink 57'	Report	De Mul 6'; De Jong 9'; Maxwell 14'; Anastasiou 19', 21', 48', 85'; Mitea 30'; Sonck 34'	Stadium: Sportpark De Koerbelt; Attendance: 3,000; Referee: -

17 July 2004	HSV de Zuidvogels (Netherlands)	0–9	(Netherlands) Ajax	Huizen, Netherlands
15:00		Report	Maduro 7'; Mitea 13'; De Mul 22'; Anastasiou 47', 64', 71', 76'; Sikora 58'; Pienaar 85'	Stadium: Sportpark De Wolfskamer; Attendance: 1,000; Referee: -

21 July 2004	Queens Park Rangers (England)	0–1	(Netherlands) Ajax	London, England
15:00		Report	Lindgren 59'	Stadium: Loftus Road; Attendance: 11,000; Referee: -

23 July 2004	Luton Town (England)	0–4	(Netherlands) Ajax	Luton, England
19:30		Report	Pienaar 8'; Sonck 39', 71'; Maxwell 45'	Stadium: Kenilworth Road; Attendance: 7,500; Referee: -

14 December 2004	FC Barcelona (Spain)	2–1	(Netherlands) Ajax	Elche, Spain
21:30	Eto'o 1', 29'	Report	Lindgren 89'	Stadium: Estadio Manuel Martínez Valero; Attendance: - Referee: -

12 January 2005	Ajax Cape Town (South Africa)	0–3	(Netherlands) Ajax	Cape Town, South Africa
15:30		Report	Charisteas 35'; Escudé 60'; Maxwell 85'	Stadium: Newlands Stadium; Attendance: 10.000

16 January 2005	Moroka Swallows (South Africa)	2–2	(Netherlands) Ajax	Cape Town, South Africa
20:00	McNab 44'; Mukansi 78'	Report	Mitea 28'; Anastasiou 69'	Stadium: Newlands Stadium; Attendance: 10.000; Referee: -

9 February 2005	Ajax (Netherlands)	2–1	Ghana (national team)	Amsterdam, Netherlands
14:00	Lindgren (?), 78'	Report	Paintsil 76'	Stadium: Sportpark De Toekomst; Attendance: 1,200; Referee: -

== Transfers ==
=== Summer ===
For a list of all Dutch football transfers in the summer window (1 July 2004 to 1 September 2004) please see List of Dutch football transfers summer 2004.

==== In ====
- The following players moved to AFC Ajax.

	Name	Position	Transfer type	Previous club	Fee
	Return from loan spell				
Substituted on	(Netherlands) Kiran Bechan	Forward	1 July 2004	(Netherlands) Sparta Rotterdam	-
Substituted on	(Ethiopia) Youssouf Hersi	Midfielder	1 July 2004	(Netherlands) N.E.C.	-
Substituted on	(Netherlands) Richard Knopper	Midfielder	1 July 2004	(Netherlands) Heerenveen	-
Substituted on	(Netherlands) Ruud Kras	Defender	1 July 2004	(Netherlands) Volendam	-
Substituted on	(Ghana) Kwame Quansah	Midfielder	1 July 2004	(Sweden) AIK	-
Substituted on	(Netherlands) Stefano Seedorf	Midfielder	1 July 2004	(Netherlands) NAC Breda	-
	Loan				
Substituted on	(Brazil) Filipe Luís	Defender	1 July 2004	(Brazil) Figueirense	-
Substituted on	(Argentina) Gastón Sangoy	Forward	1 July 2004	(Argentina) Boca Juniors	-
	Transfer				
Substituted on	(Argentina) Mauro Rosales	Forward	30 August 2004	(Argentina) Newell's Old Boys	€2.5 million
	Free Transfer				
Substituted on	(South Africa) Hans Vonk	Goalkeeper	2 June 2004	(Netherlands) Heerenveen	-

==== Out ====
- The following players moved from AFC Ajax.

	Name	Position	Transfer type	New club	Fee
	Out on loan				
Substituted off	(Belgium) Thomas Vermaelen	Defender	2 June 2004	(Netherlands) RKC Waalwijk	-
Substituted off	(Netherlands) Victor Sikora	Midfielder	1 July 2004	(Netherlands) Heerenveen	-
Substituted off	(Ghana) Abubakari Yakubu	Midfielder	1 July 2004	(Netherlands) Vitesse Arnhem	-
Substituted off	(Netherlands) Cedric van der Gun	Midfielder	28 July 2004	(Netherlands) ADO Den Haag	-
	Loan return				
Substituted off	(Sweden) Måns Sörensson	Forward	1 July 2004	(Sweden) Landskrona BoIS	-
	Transfer				
Substituted off	(Belgium) Jelle van Damme	Defender	9 June 2004	(England) Southampton	€2.9 million
Substituted off	(Finland) Petri Pasanen	Midfielder	20 July 2004	(Germany) Werder Bremen	€3.5 million
Substituted off	(Sweden) Zlatan Ibrahimović	Forward	22 August 2004	(Italy) Juventus	€16 million
	Free				
Substituted off	(Netherlands) Jamal Akachar	Forward	30 April 2004	(Netherlands) Cambuur	-
Substituted off	(Denmark) Michael Krohn-Dehli	Forward	6 May 2004	(Netherlands) RKC Waalwijk	-
Substituted off	(Ethiopia) Youssouf Hersi	Midfielder	11 June 2004	(Netherlands) Heerenveen	-
Substituted off	(Netherlands) Sander Boschker	Goalkeeper	1 July 2004	(Netherlands) Twente	-
Substituted off	(Australia) Jason Culina	Midfielder	1 July 2004	(Netherlands) Twente	-
Substituted off	(Bosnia and Herzegovina) Siniša Gagula	Defender	1 July 2004	(Bosnia and Herzegovina) Borac Banja Luka	-
Substituted off	(Netherlands) Richard Knopper	Midfielder	1 July 2004	(Netherlands) Vitesse Arnhem	-
Substituted off	(Finland) Jussi Kujala	Midfielder	1 July 2004	(Finland) Tampere United	-
Substituted off	(Finland) Jari Litmanen	Midfielder	1 July 2004	(Finland) Lahti	-
Substituted off	(Netherlands) John Nieuwenburg	Midfielder	1 July 2004	(Netherlands) Dordrecht	-
Substituted off	(Netherlands) Stefano Seedorf	Midfielder	1 July 2004	(Netherlands) Groningen	-
Substituted off	(Ecuador) José Valencia	Midfielder	14 July 2004	(Netherlands) N.E.C.	-
Substituted off	(Ghana) Kwame Quansah	Midfielder	10 August 2004	(Netherlands) Heracles Almelo	-

=== Winter ===
For a list of all Dutch football transfers in the winter window (1 January 2005 to 1 February 2005) please see List of Dutch football transfers winter 2004–05.

==== In ====
- The following players moved to AFC Ajax.

	Name	Position	Transfer type	Previous club	Fee
	Transfer				
Substituted on	(Greece) Angelos Charisteas	Forward	22 December 2004	(Germany) Werder Bremen	€4.5 million

==== Out ====
- The following players moved from AFC Ajax.

	Name	Position	Transfer type	New club	Fee
	Out on loan				
Substituted off	(Belgium) Wesley Sonck	Forward	1 January 2005	(Germany) Borussia Mönchengladbach	-
	Free				
Substituted off	(Netherlands) Kiran Bechan	Forward	19 November 2004	(Netherlands) Groningen	-
Substituted off	(Belgium) Tom Soetaers	Forward	4 January 2005	(Belgium) Racing Genk	-
Substituted off	(United States) John O'Brien	Midfielder	1 February 2005	(Netherlands) ADO Den Haag	-
