= Ryan Babel =

Dutch footballer (born 1986)

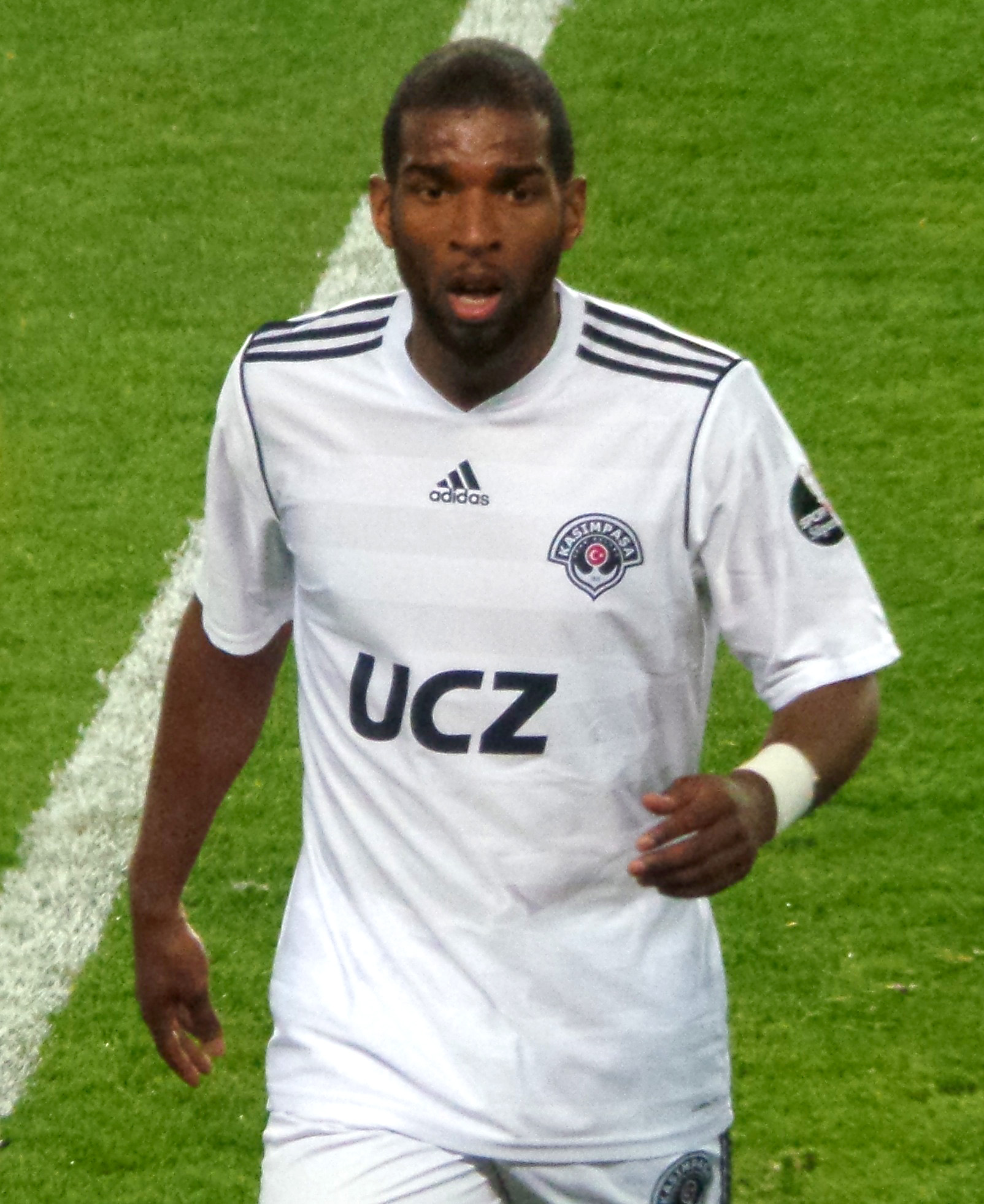
- Babel playing for Kasımpaşa in 2014

Personal information
- Full name: Ryan Guno Babel
- Date of birth: 19 December 1986 (age 39)
- Place of birth: Amsterdam, Netherlands
- Height: 1.85 m (6 ft 1 in)
- Position: Forward

Youth career
- 1992–1994: SV Diemen
- 1994–1997: ASV Fortius
- 1997–2004: Ajax

Senior career*
Years	Team	Apps	(Gls)
2004–2007	Ajax	73	(14)
2007–2011	Liverpool	91	(12)
2011–2012	TSG Hoffenheim	46	(5)
2012–2013	Ajax	16	(4)
2013–2015	Kasımpaşa	58	(14)
2015–2016	Al Ain	8	(1)
2016	Deportivo La Coruña	11	(4)
2017–2019	Beşiktaş	62	(22)
2019	Fulham	16	(5)
2019–2022	Galatasaray	77	(15)
2020	→ Ajax (loan)	5	(0)
2022–2023	Eyüpspor	28	(5)

International career^{‡}
2002–2003	Netherlands U17	6	(3)
2003–2004	Netherlands U19	6	(2)
2004–2005	Netherlands U20	4	(2)
2005–2007	Netherlands U21	5	(2)
2008	Netherlands U23	5	(2)
2005–2021	Netherlands	69	(10)
Medal record
Men's football
Representing Netherlands
FIFA World Cup
Runner-up	2010 South Africa
UEFA Nations League
Runner-up	2019 Portugal
UEFA European Under-21 Championship
Winner	2007 Netherlands
- * Club domestic league appearances and goals as of 21 August 2023 ‡ National team caps and goals as of 23:04, 30 March 2021 (UTC)

Ryan Guno Babel (Dutch pronunciation: [ˈrɑiɑm ˈbaːbəl]; born 19 December 1986) is a Dutch former professional footballer who played as a forward.

Babel began his career at Ajax in 1997, working his way up through the youth team and into the senior squad. He played three seasons for the first team before he was transferred to Liverpool in mid-2007, where under three successive managers he failed to secure a regular first team position. Babel was sold to 1899 Hoffenheim in January 2011, for a sum around half of that which Liverpool paid for him. His time at Hoffenheim was marred with disciplinary problems with three managers at the club. In the summer of 2012, Babel bought out the remaining final year of his contract, making him a free agent, and re-signed a one-year contract with Ajax. He then played for Kasımpaşa, Beşiktaş and Galatasaray in Turkey, Al Ain of the United Arab Emirates, Deportivo La Coruña and brief returns to the Premier League with Fulham and a loan to Ajax.

Babel was part of the Netherlands national team from 2005 to 2021 and has represented his country at all youth team levels. He played in two World Cups, 2006 and 2010, reaching the final of the latter.

== Early career ==
Babel was born in Amsterdam. Inspired by the local footballing talent, including Ruud Gullit and Frank Rijkaard, Babel played for nearby youth-teams S.V Diemen, then Fortius. In 1997, he attended a youth selection day with AFC Ajax. He made it through the first selection round, but failed to progress any further. However, the next year Ajax accepted him and he played the 1999–2000 season for their D1 team. After having graduated through the C1, B1 and A1 teams, Babel signed his first professional contract in January 2004.

== Club career ==
=== Ajax ===
Playing as a striker, on 1 February 2004, just one and a half months after his 17th birthday, Babel made his first-team debut in Ajax's 4–0 home win over ADO Den Haag in the Eredivisie. Ajax went on to win the Dutch league title, but Babel didn't feature again that season. Nine months later, on 20 November 2004 Babel scored his first senior goal against De Graafschap in a 5–0 victory.

In July 2005, Babel signed a new contract with Ajax. He started the new season by scoring the winning goal in Ajax's 2–1 defeat of PSV Eindhoven in the Johan Cruyff Shield. Babel scored in both legs of the Champions League third qualifying round against Brøndby as Ajax made it to the group stage. 2005–06 was a tougher season for Babel in general though as he managed only two league goals. He did however continue to feature for the national team, and scored his second goal against Italy in November. At the end of the season, Babel came on as a second-half substitute in Ajax's 2–1 victory over PSV in the KNVB Cup final.

Babel marked the start of 2006–07 with another Johan Cruyff Shield medal, as Ajax defeated PSV 3–1. Babel was linked with Arsenal and Newcastle United during the January transfer window of the 2006–07 season but no move materialised. Amidst the transfer speculation, Babel agreed to a new three-year deal with Ajax on 2 February 2007. In May, Babel got another Dutch Cup winners medal as Ajax successfully defended the title. The match against AZ went to a penalty shoot-out, but Babel was substituted off after 120 minutes.

=== Liverpool ===
On 10 July 2007, it was reported that Liverpool had made a £14 million offer to the Amsterdam club. On 12 July it was reported that Liverpool and Ajax had agreed a fee in the region of £11.5 million, and later Liverpool confirmed that Babel would sign a five-year contract on 13 July. He was unveiled on 13 July with Yossi Benayoun. Babel was handed the number 19 shirt. He made his debut on 17 July against Werder Bremen in a friendly. He was due to play in the first round of the Barclays Asia Trophy 2007 but had a delay in the granting of international clearance. This was sorted out in time for the final against Portsmouth.

He made his Premier League debut in the 2007–08 Premier League curtain raiser against Aston Villa away after coming on off the bench. A week later he made his Anfield debut, coming off the bench against Chelsea. On 1 September Babel scored his first goal for Liverpool against Derby County. Babel scored his first Champions League goal for Liverpool on 6 November against Beşiktaş J.K. after coming on as a substitute. He netted twice in the game and almost completed a hat-trick, with a header from a Harry Kewell cross, but was denied by the crossbar. Babel scored the fourth and last goal in Liverpool's 2007–08 UEFA Champions League group stage match against Olympique de Marseille, which they needed to win. He came off the bench in the second leg of the quarter-final against Arsenal in the Champions League and won a penalty and scored a goal, with Liverpool winning the game 4–2 (5–3 on aggregate). He also came on as a substitute against Chelsea in the semi-final and despite scoring a goal, Liverpool lost 3–2 in extra time.

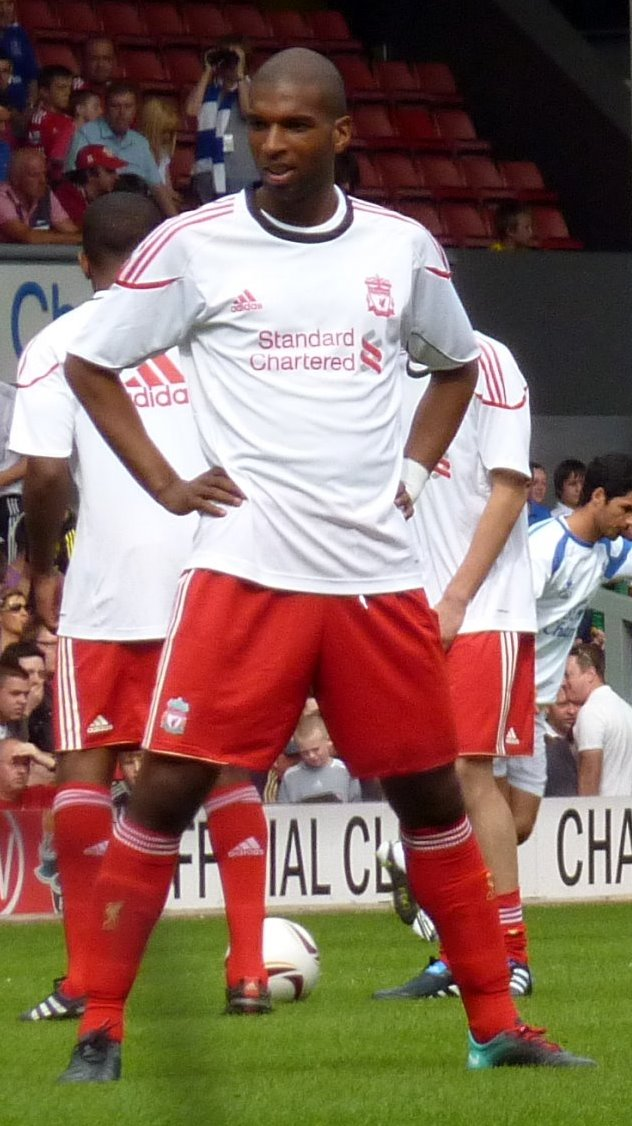
Babel with Liverpool in 2010

Former Liverpool and Celtic player Kenny Dalglish has said that Babel has the ability to terrorise defenders in the Premier League with his pace and trickery with the ball. On 13 September 2008, Babel came off the bench to score the winner for Liverpool in a 2–1 victory over Manchester United, his first goal of the 2008–09 season Babel scored his second goal of the season in Liverpool's 5–1 victory over Newcastle United on 28 December 2008.

On 20 September 2009, with the score 2–2 against West Ham, Babel came off the bench for Dirk Kuyt, setting up an assist for Fernando Torres to head home the winner. Babel, who has been criticised in the past for his work rate and attitude, earned praise for his efforts in the West Ham game. On 27 September 2009, Babel scored two goals against Hull City coming off the bench for Fernando Torres to round up a match which ended 6–1 for Liverpool. On 4 November 2009, Babel scored the opening goal against Lyon in a Champions League game, a strike from 25 yards in a 1–1 draw. Former Liverpool player Alan Hansen called upon Babel to play like he did against Lyon, as he still possessed the ability to be a 'top player'.

On 6 January 2010, it was reported that Liverpool rejected an £8 million offer from Birmingham City for Babel. Babel was then disciplined by manager Benitez, over stating on his Twitter page that he had been dropped for the game against Stoke City, and was fined two weeks wages of £120,000. He was frequently linked with a move away from Anfield but Rafael Benitez stated his desire for Babel to stay. On 15 March 2010 he scored against Portsmouth in a 4–1 win. On 1 April 2010, he was sent off for the first time in his Liverpool career in the 30th minute of the first leg of the Europa League quarter-final against S.L. Benfica after an altercation with Luisão. He scored in Liverpool's 4–0 win over Burnley at Turf Moor, subsequently relegating Burnley to the Championship. On 19 August 2010, Babel scored the winner against Trabzonspor in the Europa League qualifier first leg, it was his first game of the 2010–11 season. He started his first match in the Premier League at Anfield against Aston Villa and scored his first goal in the Premier League with a right-footed volley that beat former Liverpool goalkeeper Brad Friedel.

Babel gained further notoriety amongst fans when, on transfer deadline day 31 August 2010, it was reported that the player was travelling by helicopter between Liverpool and an unspecified London location as possible transfer talks with Tottenham and West Ham were ongoing, and there was speculation about his true destination. No transfer actually occurred and the helicopter story may be apocryphal, but the image stuck and the term "Babelcopter" became a metaphor for players with an uncertain destination on future transfer deadline days, with the player himself promoting the use of the hashtag #BabelCopter.

One of the first Premier League players to use Twitter to communicate with fans, in January 2011, Babel posted a photoshopped image on Twitter of referee Howard Webb in a Manchester United shirt following Liverpool's 1–0 defeat to United in the FA Cup. He was subsequently charged by the F.A. with improper conduct and fined £10,000.

On 18 January, Liverpool agreed a fee believed to be in the region of £7 million for Babel from TSG 1899 Hoffenheim. On 24 January, Kenny Dalglish said that Babel would be staying at Liverpool, but the next day Babel flew to Germany to finalise the deal to sign with Hoffenheim.

=== 1899 Hoffenheim ===
On 25 January 2011, it was confirmed that Babel had left Liverpool to join German side TSG 1899 Hoffenheim for a reported fee of £8 million, signing a two-and-a-half-year deal.

His first competitive match was on 26 January 2011 in the DFB Cup quarter final match against FC Energie Cottbus. He is well known for his 'left little finger out' celebration, in support of disadvantaged youths in Amsterdam. On 9 April 2011, Babel scored his first goal for Hoffenheim, in a 3–2 loss to SC Freiburg. In the 2011–12 Bundesliga season, Babel netted his first league goal of the season on 20 August 2011 against Augsburg in a 2–0 away win. On 10 September 2011, he scored his first brace for 1899 Hoffenheim in a 4–0 win against Mainz 05 and scored again in the next game on 17 September in a 3–1 win over VfL Wolfsburg.

After playing for Hoffenheim for 18 months, scoring six goals in 51 matches, he was released by the club on 31 August 2012.

=== Return to Ajax ===
After personally buying off the remaining year of his contract with Hoffenheim, he returned to his old club Ajax on a one-year deal. Wearing shirt number 49, the same number he wore when he made his first ever appearance for the first team at Ajax, he made his debut with Ajax for the 2012–13 season on 15 September 2012, in a regular season match against RKC Waalwijk. He came on as a substitute for Derk Boerrigter in the second half, assisting Jody Lukoki on the second goal in the 2–0 home win for the Amsterdam side. He scored his first goal since returning to Ajax in a match against ADO Den Haag on 23 September 2012.

Struggling with a slight injury midway through the season, Babel managed to play a total of 16 league matches for Ajax, scoring four goals in total in the Eredivisie. He also made four appearances in the 2012–13 UEFA Champions League, as well as two more appearances in the 2012–13 KNVB Cup, where he scored the second goal in the '15-minute of the second round fixture against FC Utrecht, with the match ending 3–0 for the Amsterdam side prior to his injury. He would return to action after being sidelined to help his side secure their 3rd consecutive national title and 32nd overall.

=== Later career ===
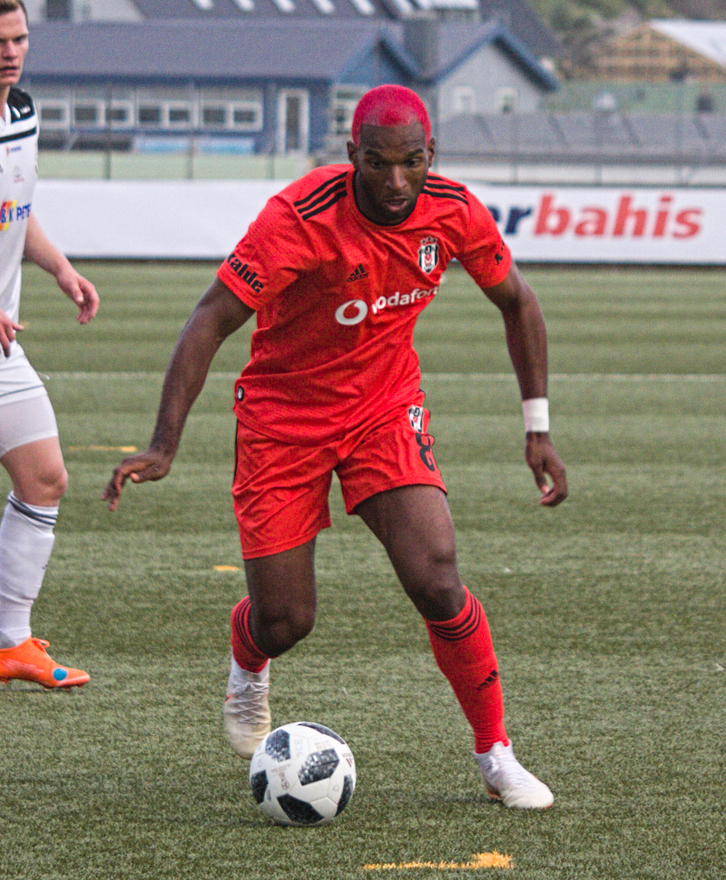
Babel playing for Beşiktaş in 2018

Opting not to extend his contract with Ajax in order to make way for the next generation, Babel decided to join Turkish side Kasımpaşa where former Ajax player Shota Arveladze was the current manager. He was joined in Turkey by fellow Amsterdam-born defender Ryan Donk who made the transfer from Belgian side Club Brugge.

Babel signed a contract with UAE Arabian Gulf League champions Al Ain to replace the outgoing Miroslav Stoch. He signed the contract after passing a medical test on 2 July 2015. In December 2015, Al Ain and Babel were involved in a conflict over Babel's disciplinary issues with the club's hierarchy and regarding his use of social media. The club demoted him to the reserves citing poor performance.

Babel joined Deportivo de La Coruña in La Liga on 17 September 2016, having been without a club since leaving the UAE. His contract was set to last for the rest of the calendar year. On 22 December, after three goals in the last four games helped Depor out of the relegation zone, he said that he would allow his contract to expire due to overseas offers that would be more convenient to his family.

In January 2017, Babel joined Beşiktaş on a two-and-a-half-year deal. Despite only joining the club in January, Babel became a crucial member of the squad that season, making 18 league appearances and scoring 5 goals as he helped Beşiktaş secure their fifteenth league title.

On 15 January 2019, Babel signed for Premier League club Fulham on a contract until the end of the 2018–19 season. In June 2019, he agreed to join Galatasaray on a three-year deal. On 9 January 2020, it was announced that Ajax would receive Babel on loan until the end of the season. In July 2020, Babel returned from loan and played for Galatasaray until his contract expired in July 2022. On 29 July 2022, Babel joined Turkish club Eyüpspor. On 9 November 2024, Babel announced his decision to retire from football.

== International career ==
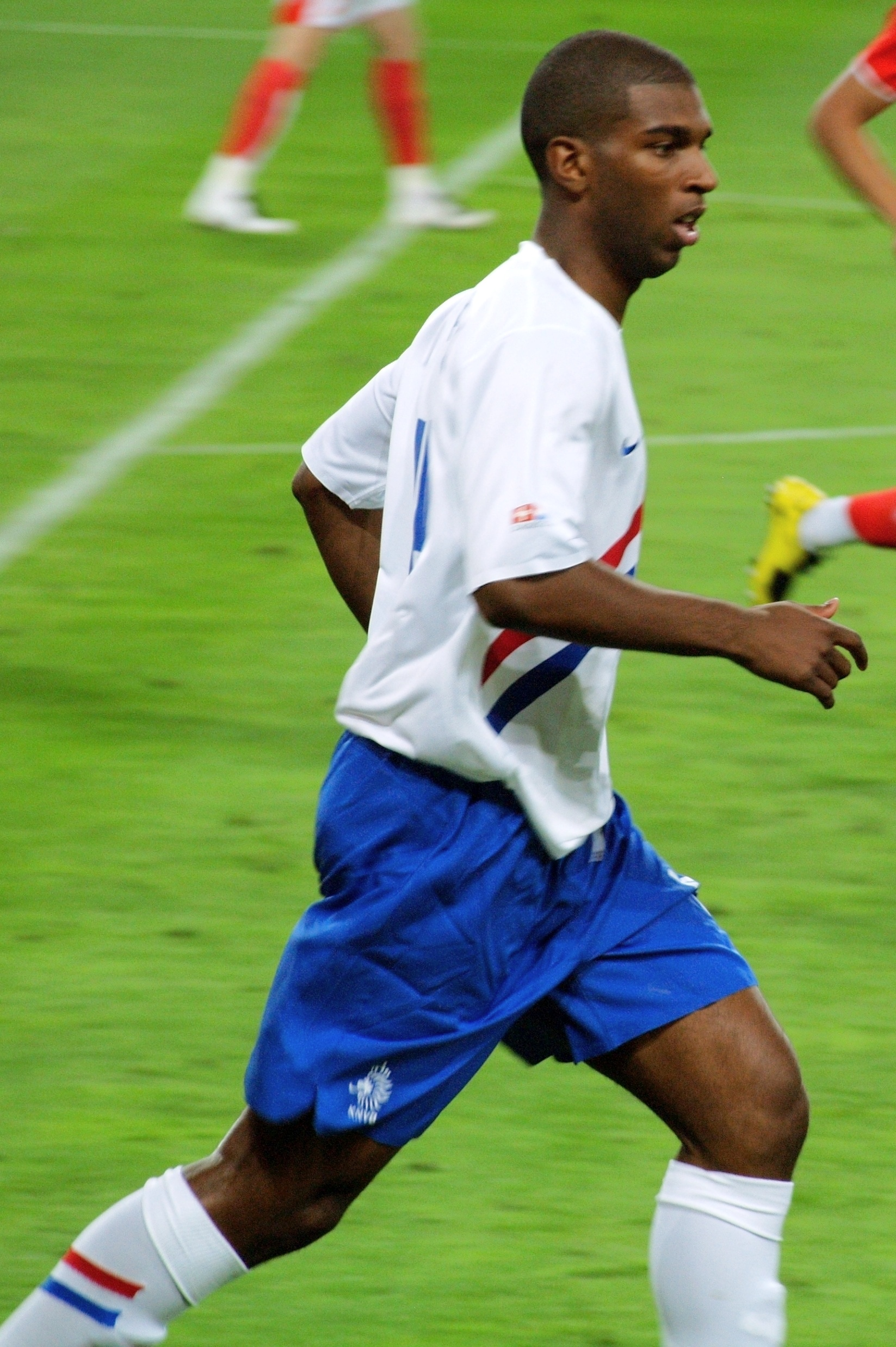
Babel playing for the Netherlands in 2007

Babel was born in the Netherlands and is of Surinamese descent. He took part in the 2005 FIFA World Youth Championship. Babel scored two goals in four games as the Netherlands reached the quarter-finals. There they were defeated by Nigeria, 10–9 in a penalty shoot-out (Babel scored his penalty).

Later that season, Babel made his international debut on 26 March 2005, away against Romania. He entered the game as a first-half substitute for Arjen Robben and went on to score the second goal in a 2–0 victory. The goal made Babel the youngest goalscorer in 68 years for the Netherlands and the fourth-youngest of all time. Babel had been a first team regular with Ajax in 2004–05 and finished with seven league goals in 22 appearances.

In 2006, Marco van Basten included Babel in the Dutch squad for 2006 FIFA World Cup. Due to a knee injury however, Babel only featured once, as a second-half substitute for Ruud van Nistelrooy in the group match against Argentina. Van Basten has been quoted as saying Babel "has all the potential to become the next Thierry Henry".

In June 2007, Babel was part of the Netherlands under-21 team competing in the UEFA Under-21 Championship, being held in the Netherlands. In the group stage, Babel scored a penalty against Portugal, helping the Dutch to secure a semi-final spot and thus qualifying for the 2008 Summer Olympics in Beijing. His second tournament goal came during his man of the match performance in the final as the Netherlands defeated Serbia 4–1 to retain their title.

In May 2008, Babel was selected for the Dutch squad which would compete in the UEFA Euro 2008 tournament. On 31 May, it was announced that Babel had been withdrawn from the squad after tearing ankle ligaments in training. Van Basten added then-Chelsea defender Khalid Boulahrouz to his squad in place of Babel.

Babel was included in the preliminary squad for the 2010 FIFA World Cup in South Africa. On 27 May 2010, Netherlands manager Bert van Marwijk announced that the player would be part of the final squad of 23 participating in the competition. Though the Netherlands reached the final, Babel did not appear in any of the matches during the tournament.

Babel returned in Oranje after an absence of almost a year on 11 November 2011 as a starter in the pre Euro 2012 0–0 drawn friendly against Switzerland.

On 29 September 2017, Babel was recalled to the Oranje squad after a six-year absence for the 2018 FIFA World Cup qualifiers against Sweden and Belarus. The Netherlands failed to qualify for the tournament; despite this, Babel was regularly called up for the upcoming inaugural UEFA Nations League campaign. He scored the equaliser in a 2–1 away defeat to France in the Netherlands' first Nations League match.

== Career statistics ==
=== Club ===
As of match played 4 June 2023

Appearances and goals by club, season and competition
Club	Season	League			National cup (Note: Includes KNVB Cup, FA Cup, DFB-Pokal, Turkish Cup, Copa del Rey)		League cup (Note: Includes Football League Cup, UAE League Cup)		Continental		Other		Total	
Club	Season	Division	Apps	Goals	Apps	Goals	Apps	Goals	Apps	Goals	Apps	Goals	Apps	Goals
Ajax	2003–04	Eredivisie	1	0	—		—		0	0	0	0	1	0
Ajax	2004–05	Eredivisie	20	7	3	1	—		4 (Note: Appearances in UEFA Champions League)	1	0	0	27	9
Ajax	2005–06	Eredivisie	25	2	3	2	—		11	2	1 (Note: Appearance in Johan Cruyff Shield)	1	40	7
Ajax	2006–07	Eredivisie	27	5	4	0	—		7 (Note: Two appearances in UEFA Champions League, five appearances and two goals in UEFA Cup)	2	1	0	39	7
Ajax	Total		73	14	10	3	—		22	5	2	1	107	23
Liverpool	2007–08	Premier League	30	4	4	1	2	0	13	5	—		49	10
Liverpool	2008–09	Premier League	27	3	3	0	2	0	10	1	—		42	4
Liverpool	2009–10	Premier League	25	4	1	0	2	0	10 (Note: Three appearances and one goal in UEFA Champions League, seven appearances and one goal in UEFA Europa League)	2	—		38	6
Liverpool	2010–11	Premier League	9	1	1	0	1	0	6 (Note: Appearances in UEFA Europa League)	1	—		17	2
Liverpool	Total		91	12	9	1	7	0	39	9	—		146	22
1899 Hoffenheim	2010–11	Bundesliga	15	1	1	0	—		—		—		16	1
1899 Hoffenheim	2011–12	Bundesliga	31	4	4	1	—		—		—		35	5
1899 Hoffenheim	Total		46	5	5	1	—		—		—		51	6
Ajax	2012–13	Eredivisie	16	4	2	1	—		4	0	0	0	22	5
Kasımpaşa	2013–14	Süper Lig	29	5	1	0	—		—		—		30	5
Kasımpaşa	2014–15	Süper Lig	29	9	0	0	—		—		—		29	9
Kasımpaşa	Total		58	14	1	0	—		—		—		59	14
Al-Ain	2015–16	UAE Pro League	8	1	0	0	5	1	—		1 (Note: Appearance in UAE Super Cup)	0	14	2
Deportivo La Coruña	2016–17	La Liga	11	4	1	1	—		—		—		12	5
Beşiktaş	2016–17	Süper Lig	18	5	0	0	—		6	3	0	0	24	8
Beşiktaş	2017–18	Süper Lig	32	13	4	0	—		6	2	1 (Note: Appearance in Turkish Super Cup)	0	43	15
Beşiktaş	2018–19	Süper Lig	12	4	0	0	—		7	2	—		19	6
Beşiktaş	Total		62	22	4	0	—		19	7	1	0	86	29
Fulham	2018–19	Premier League	16	5	0	0	0	0	—		—		16	5
Galatasaray	2019–20	Süper Lig	15	5	0	0	—		4	0	1	0	20	5
Galatasaray	2020–21	Süper Lig	32	7	2	0	—		3	1	—		37	8
Galatasaray	2021–22	Süper Lig	30	3	0	0	—		13 (Note: Two appearances in UEFA Champions League, eleven appearances and one goal in UEFA Europa League)	1	—		43	4
Galatasaray	Total		77	15	2	0	—		20	2	1	0	100	17
Ajax (loan)	2019–20	Eredivisie	5	0	2	1	—		2	0	0	0	9	1
Eyüpspor	2022–23	TFF First League	27	5	1	0	—		—		—		28	5
Career total			490	101	37	8	12	1	106	23	5	1	650	134

=== International ===
As of match played 30 March 2021

National team	Year	Apps	Goals
Netherlands	2005	4	2
Netherlands	2006	7	1
Netherlands	2007	10	1
Netherlands	2008	8	1
Netherlands	2009	8	0
Netherlands	2010	3	0
Netherlands	2011	2	0
Netherlands	2012	0	0
Netherlands	2013	0	0
Netherlands	2014	0	0
Netherlands	2015	0	0
Netherlands	2016	0	0
Netherlands	2017	4	1
Netherlands	2018	8	2
Netherlands	2019	9	2
Netherlands	2020	4	0
Netherlands	2021	2	0
Total		69	10

As of match played 9 September 2019. Netherlands score listed first, score column indicates score after each Babel goal.

International goals by date, venue, opponent, score, result and competition
No.	Date	Venue	Opponent	Score	Result	Competition
1	26 March 2005	Stadionul Giuleşti, Bucharest, Romania	Romania	2–0	2–0	2006 FIFA World Cup qualification
2	12 November 2005	Amsterdam Arena, Amsterdam, Netherlands	Italy	1–0	1–3	Friendly
3	1 June 2006	Philips Stadion, Eindhoven, Netherlands	Mexico	2–1	2–1	Friendly
4	7 February 2007	Amsterdam Arena, Amsterdam, Netherlands	Russia	1–0	4–1	Friendly
5	24 May 2008	De Kuip, Rotterdam, Netherlands	Ukraine	3–0	3–0	Friendly
6	14 November 2017	Arena Națională, Bucharest, Romania	Romania	2–0	3–0	Friendly
7	26 March 2018	Stade de Genève, Geneva, Switzerland	Portugal	2–0	3–0	Friendly
8	9 September 2018	Stade de France, Saint-Denis, France	France	1–1	1–2	2018–19 UEFA Nations League A
9	9 September 2019	A. Le Coq Arena, Tallinn, Estonia	Estonia	1–0	4–0	UEFA Euro 2020 qualifying
10	9 September 2019	A. Le Coq Arena, Tallinn, Estonia	Estonia	2–0	4–0	UEFA Euro 2020 qualifying

== Honours ==
Ajax

- Eredivisie: 2003–04, 2012–13
- KNVB Cup: 2005–06, 2006–07
- Johan Cruyff Shield: 2005, 2006

Al Ain

- UAE Super Cup: 2015

Beşiktaş

- Süper Lig: 2016–17

Galatasaray

- Turkish Super Cup: 2019

Netherlands U21

- UEFA European Under-21 Football Championship: 2007

Netherlands

- FIFA World Cup runner-up: 2010
- UEFA Nations League runner-up: 2018–19

Individual

- UEFA European Under-21 Championship Team of the Tournament: 2007
- Ajax Talent of the Year (Marco van Basten Award): 2006–07
