= Jerry de Jong =

Dutch footballer (1964–2026)

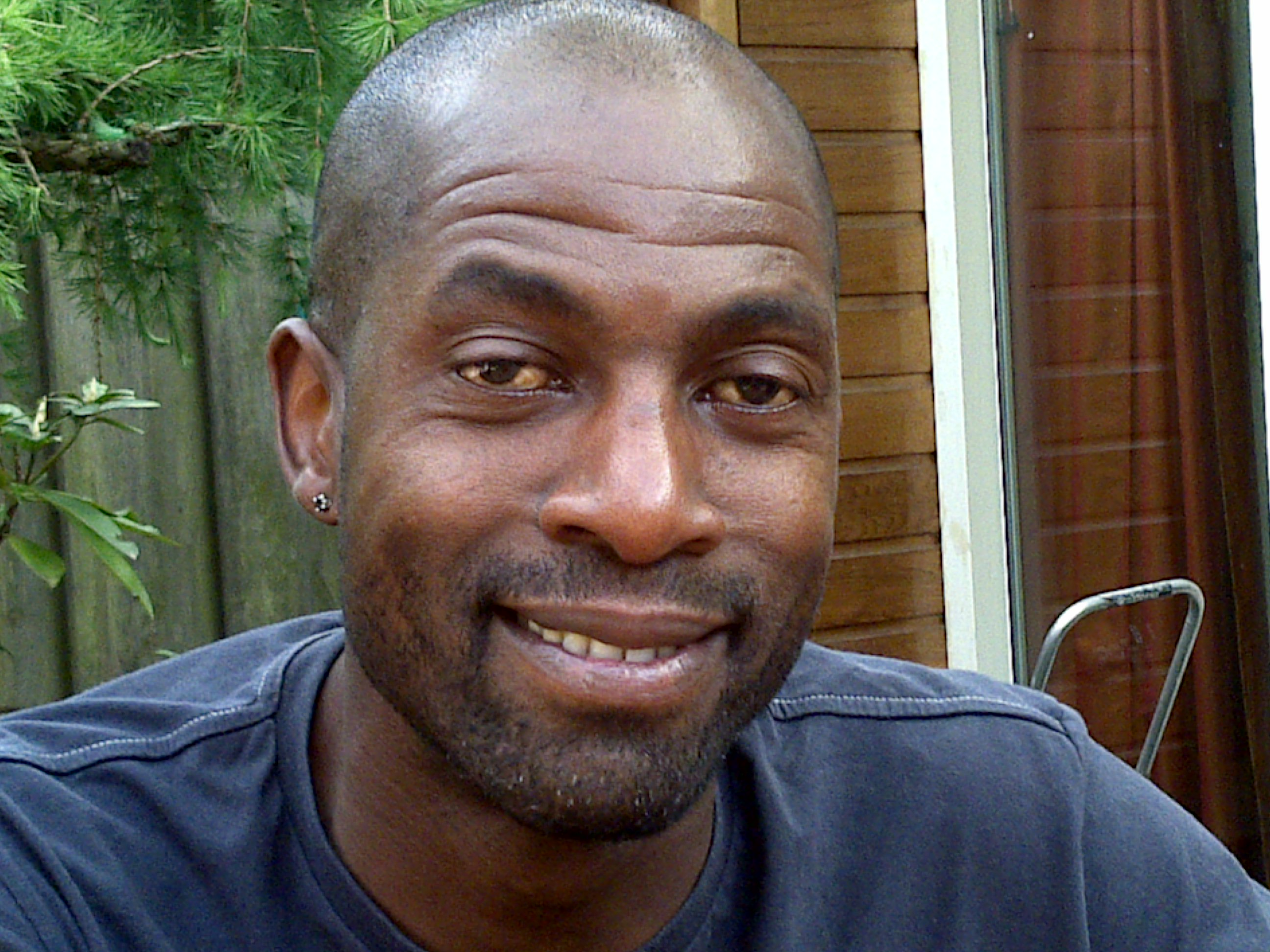
- De Jong in 2010

Personal information
- Full name: Jerry Murrien de Jong
- Date of birth: 29 August 1964
- Place of birth: Paramaribo, Suriname
- Date of death: 14 June 2026 (aged 61)
- Place of death: Hattem, Netherlands
- Position: Defender

Youth career
- SDW
- AZ '67

Senior career*
Years	Team	Apps	(Gls)
1984–1987	Telstar	95	(8)
1988–1989	Heerenveen	50	(3)
1989–1994	PSV	51	(2)
1993	→ Groningen (loan)	12	(0)
1994–1995	Caen	15	(0)
1995–1997	FC Eindhoven	42	(3)
1997–2001	MVV	102	(10)
Total		367	(26)

International career
1990–1991	Netherlands	3	(0)
- * Club domestic league appearances and goals

Jerry Murrien de Jong (29 August 1964 – 14 June 2026) was a Dutch professional footballer who played as a defender or defensive midfielder.

De Jong played for seven clubs during a 17-year professional career, including PSV Eindhoven.

== Career ==
Born in Paramaribo, Suriname, de Jong started his career in the second division, where he played for Telstar and SC Heerenveen. He earned a reputation as a tough tackler, and his performances did not go unnoticed by Eredivisie clubs, and joined PSV Eindhoven in the summer of 1989.

At Eindhoven, de Jong's career never really took off due to stiff competition for places, and after having played only 51 games in five years, which included a short loan spell at FC Groningen, he was eventually released. However, during his time at PSV, he was capped three times for the Netherlands, making his debut on 21 November 1990 against Greece in a UEFA Euro 1992 qualifying match; his last international was on 17 April 1991 against Finland, for the same competition.

De Jong moved to France in 1994, signing with Ligue 1 side Caen. After an uneventful season (only 15 matches, relegation), he returned home, playing for FC Eindhoven and MVV Maastricht. He retired at almost 37.

== Personal life and death ==
De Jong's son, Nigel, was also a footballer who represented the Netherlands at international level.

De Jong died on 14 June 2026, at the age of 61.
