= Nigel de Jong =

Dutch association football player (born 1984)

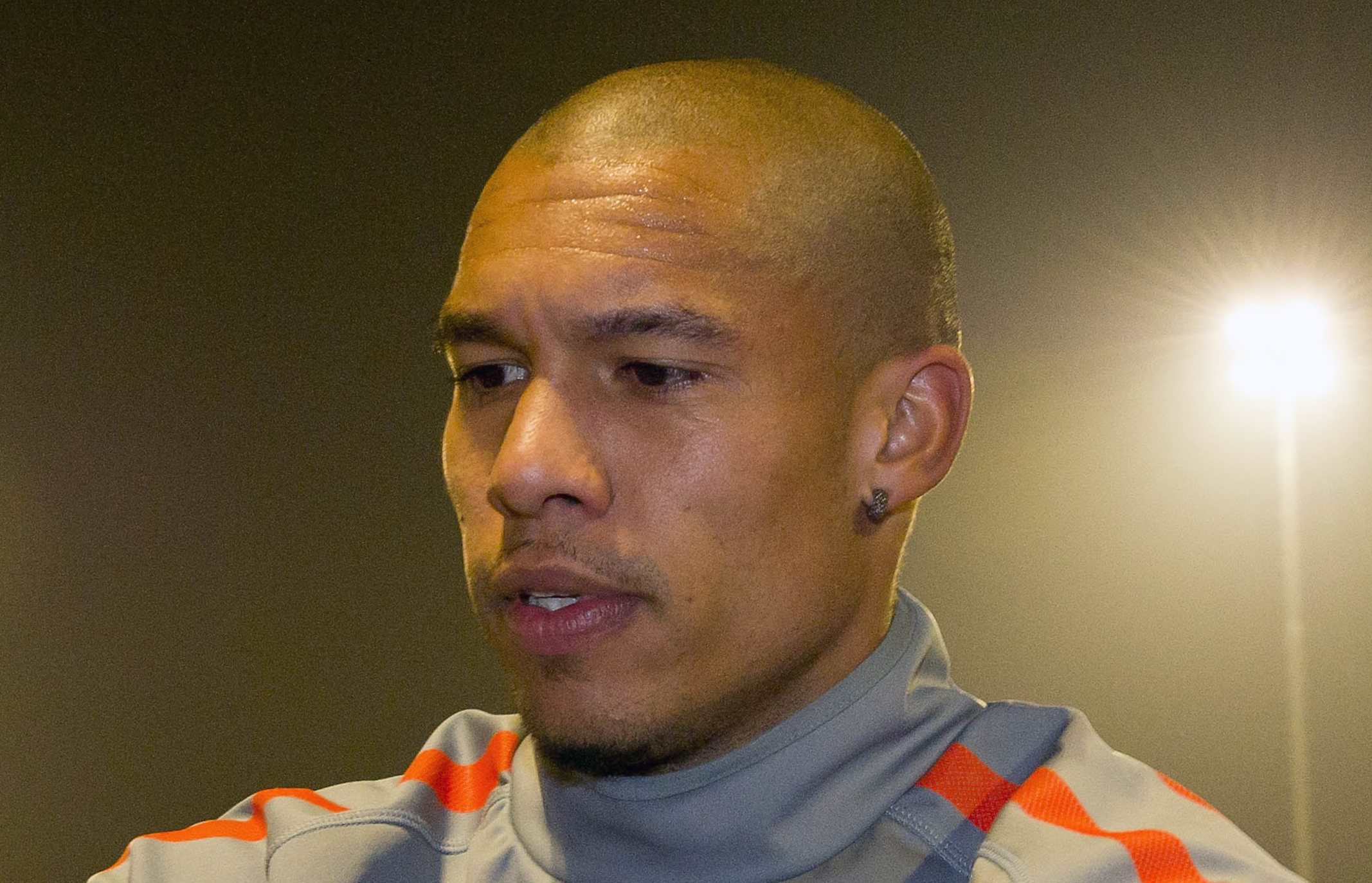
- De Jong with the Netherlands national team in 2011

Personal information
- Full name: Nigel de Jong
- Date of birth: 30 November 1984 (age 41)
- Place of birth: Amsterdam, Netherlands
- Height: 1.74 m (5 ft 9 in)
- Position: Defensive midfielder

Youth career
- 1993–2002: Ajax

Senior career*
Years	Team	Apps	(Gls)
2002–2006	Ajax	96	(9)
2006–2009	Hamburger SV	66	(3)
2009–2012	Manchester City	104	(1)
2012–2016	AC Milan	79	(6)
2016	LA Galaxy	18	(0)
2016–2018	Galatasaray	18	(1)
2018	Mainz 05	11	(0)
2018–2019	Al Ahli	21	(4)
2019–2021	Al-Shahania	36	(0)
Total		449	(24)

International career
2002–2005	Netherlands U21	10	(0)
2004–2015	Netherlands	81	(1)
Medal record
Representing Netherlands
Men's football
FIFA World Cup
Runner-up	2010 South Africa
Third place	2014 Brazil
- * Club domestic league appearances and goals

Nigel de Jong (born 30 November 1984) is a Dutch former professional footballer who played as a defensive midfielder. He is currently the technical director of the KNVB, the national Dutch football federation. He has also worked as an English language pundit for beIN Sports covering Premier League and Champions League football as well as for ITV for Euro 2020 and the 2022 World Cup.

De Jong joined the Ajax youth academy and made the first team at age 17. He moved in 2006 to join Hamburg and then joined Manchester City in January 2009 for an estimated £18 million, where he became an important part of their holding midfield. A tireless grafter, he garnered a reputation of being a combative and feisty player in his performances, a reputation that earned him nicknames such as "The Destroyer" and "Lawnmower". He moved to Italian side AC Milan in August 2012, before joining MLS side LA Galaxy in February 2016. He subsequently had spells with Galatasaray in Turkey, Mainz 05 in Germany, and Al Ahli and Al-Shahania in Qatar.

De Jong made his international debut at the age of 19, and obtained 81 caps between 2004 and 2015, scoring one goal. He took part at two European Championships and two editions of the FIFA World Cup with the Netherlands, winning a World Cup runners-up medal in 2010, and a bronze medal at the 2014 FIFA World Cup.

== Early and personal life ==
De Jong was born in Amsterdam. He is of Surinamese-Dutch descent; Surinamese, parentage from his father, while Dutch from his mother. His father is former Dutch international Jerry de Jong.

== Club career ==
=== Ajax ===
On 19 October 2002, De Jong made his debut for the Ajax first team. He scored his first goal of his senior career on 18 February 2003 in a 1–1 draw against Arsenal in the Champions League. He became a first team regular the following season, in which Ajax won the Eredivisie title. In 2004–05, his last full season in Amsterdam, De Jong was named Ajax Player of the Season. After a period when he appeared regularly in midfield, he found himself sitting on the bench more often than being in the starting line-up. On 7 December 2005, it was announced that De Jong did not wish to extend his contract with Ajax, which was due to end in July 2006.

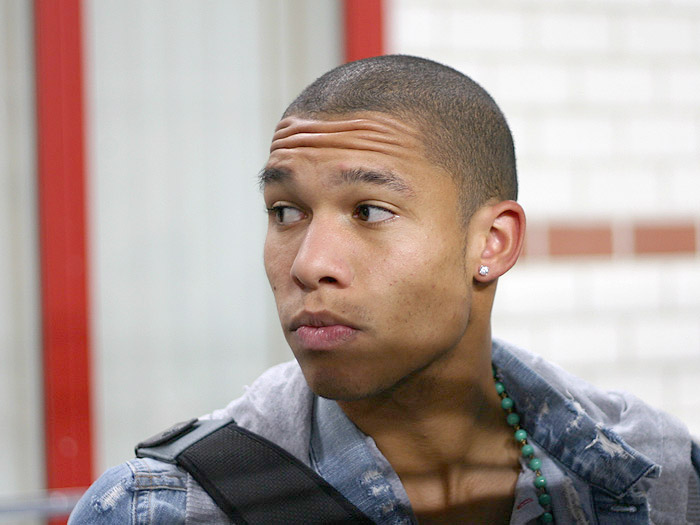
De Jong made 126 official appearances for Ajax

=== Hamburg ===
On 26 January 2006, De Jong signed a four-and-a-half-year contract at Bundesliga club Hamburg, the transfer fee approximately €1 million. At Hamburg he joined two other Dutchmen: Rafael van der Vaart and Khalid Boulahrouz. He made his Hamburg debut two days later in a 2–1 defeat at Nürnberg. In March 2006, De Jong scored the winning goal in Bayern Munich's first ever defeat at the Allianz Arena. The following week he received the first red card of his career for a second booking in a UEFA Cup match against Rapid București. His season was cut short in April, when he required surgery on a knee problem. The injury also kept him out of the Dutch squad for the 2006 World Cup, though he was later put on standby after regaining fitness.

=== Manchester City ===
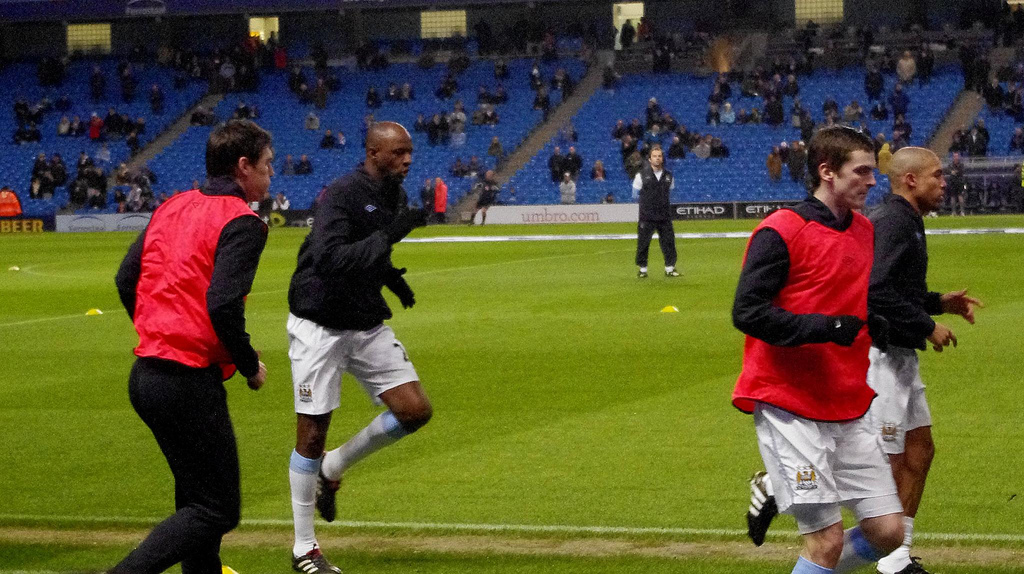
De Jong (far right) with Manchester City teammates.

On 21 January 2009, De Jong was signed to Manchester City for an estimated fee of £18 million by manager Mark Hughes who deployed him in the role of midfield enforcer in a team whose defence badly needed reinforcement. He signed a four-and-a-half-year contract. and was assigned the number 34 shirt. He made his debut for the club against Newcastle United on 28 January 2009. He made sixteen appearances in the Premier League over the second half of the season.

De Jong was given a start against Arsenal on 12 September 2009. He was named Man of the Match by Sky Sports in a 2–1 win over Chelsea on 5 December 2009. By the end of the season he had become a firm fans' favourite as well as being one of new manager Roberto Mancini's first picks as defensive midfielder as the team narrowly missed out on a Champions League berth. De Jong scored his first goal for Manchester City in a 2–1 victory against West Ham United on 1 May 2011.

De Jong was a member of the City side which won the 2010–11 FA Cup and the 2011–12 Premier League, making 137 appearances and scoring twice before being sold to A.C. Milan in August 2012.

=== AC Milan ===
On 31 August 2012, De Jong joined Italian club AC Milan for £3.5 million rising to £5 million depending on appearances, signing a three-year deal. On 1 September, De Jong made his debut against Bologna. De Jong scored his first goal for Milan in a 3–2 loss against Lazio on 20 October.

On 4 May 2014, De Jong scored his second goal for Milan, the winning goal against Inter Milan in the Derby della Madonnina at the San Siro.

On 26 June 2015, Milan announced De Jong had signed a contract extension to keep him at the club until 2018.

=== LA Galaxy ===
On 31 January 2016, it was reported that De Jong had negotiated to terminate his contract with Milan and joined LA Galaxy on a free transfer, signing a one-year deal. He was involved in a controversial incident in a game against the Portland Timbers on 10 April when his strong tackle left Darlington Nagbe injured and in need of treatment. De Jong was only shown a yellow card by referee Allen Chapman, but was later suspended for three games. He received a red-card after a bad tackle on Blas Perez on 5 July; although they were a man down, the Galaxy were still able to hold on for the win over the Vancouver Whitecaps.

On 29 August 2016, the Galaxy announced that they and the Dutch midfielder mutually agreed to terminate de Jong's contract, freeing the 31-year-old to sign with Turkey's Galatasaray. De Jong reportedly would have been tagged as a Designated Player for the upcoming 2017 season. He appeared in 18 regular season contests for Los Angeles, failing to record a goal or an assist in regular season play but establishing himself as a starting presence as a defensive midfielder.

=== Later career ===
On 31 August 2016, De Jong signed for Turkish outfit Galatasaray on a two-year deal.

On 5 January 2018, De Jong's contract was terminated by Galatasaray. On the same day, he agreed a free transfer to Bundesliga side Mainz 05. In July 2018, De Jong moved to Qatari club Al Ahli. A year later, he moved to Al-Shahania in the same league.

== International career ==
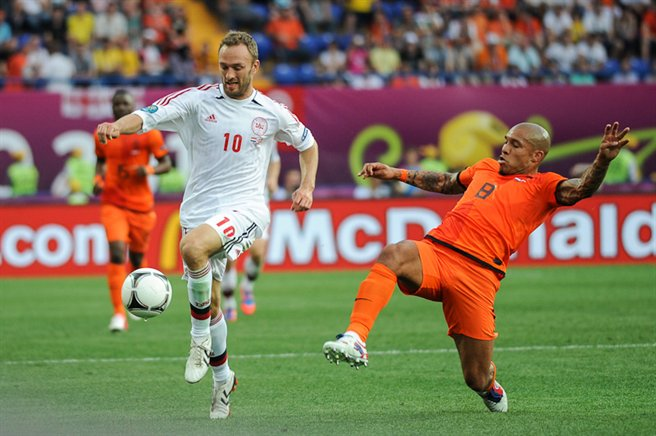
De Jong (right) in action for the Netherlands at the UEFA Euro 2012

On 31 March 2004, De Jong made his debut with the Netherlands in a friendly game against France. He was overlooked for the squad that went to play in UEFA Euro 2004, and missed the 2006 FIFA World Cup with a knee injury. He was selected by Marco van Basten to play for the Oranje at UEFA Euro 2008. During the tournament, he was played as a "screening midfielder", partnering with Orlando Engelaar in central midfield. This resulted in De Jong playing three out of the four games that saw the Netherlands reach the quarter-final stage, where they lost to Russia. De Jong scored his first international goal against Iceland on 6 June 2009 in a 2010 FIFA World Cup qualifying match, which sealed the Netherlands' passage to the 2010 World Cup.

De Jong was part of the Dutch team for the 2010 FIFA World Cup managed by Bert van Marwijk. The player was in the starting line-up for their first match in the competition, a 2–0 victory over Denmark. He was suspended in the semi-final against Uruguay after receiving his second yellow card of the tournament in the Netherlands' quarter-final win over Brazil. He played in the final of the competition, which the Netherlands lost 1–0 to Spain after extra time. In the early stages of the match, De Jong made a chest high challenge on Xabi Alonso, with his studs making contact with the Spaniard's ribs. Referee Howard Webb later stated that he would have sent off De Jong if he'd had a better view of the incident.

De Jong was part of the Netherlands UEFA Euro 2012 squad. The Dutch were eliminated in the first round after losing all three matches.

He was also selected for the 2014 FIFA World Cup, where he was in the starting line-up for all three group matches. However, a groin injury led to his substitution in the ninth minute of the Round of 16 match win over Mexico and it was later confirmed the De Jong would be unable to take any further part in the tournament. Despite this, he later recovered to play 62 minutes of the semi-final against Argentina, which the Netherlands lost 4–2 on a penalty shoot-out, following a 0–0 draw after extra-time.

== Technical director of Dutch national football association ==
On 4 January 2023, he was appointed as technical director of the KNVB. The job involves overseeing the country’s national teams and De Jong will also be responsible for developing and implementing football-technical policy at clubs across the country.

== Style of play ==
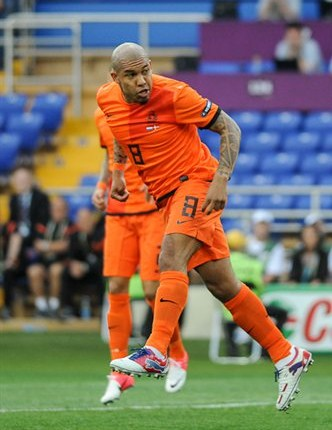
De Jong in action for the Netherlands

De Jong began his career as an offensive-minded creative midfielder or forward. At Ajax, he played a number of positions, including central midfield and right wing. De Jong credits his conversion to a defensive-minded player to Huub Stevens, under whom he played at Hamburg. Described as a "tireless grafter" by The Telegraph, his work-rate and tenacity, combined with his new approach to midfield play, earned him the nicknames "der Rasenmäher" ("the Lawnmower"), "The Terrier" and "The Destroyer". De Jong was typically the most defensively oriented midfielder in his team. When his team's defenders were in possession of the ball, De Jong would often drop back towards them to receive it. Sometimes, De Jong was the sole holding midfielder, but often he played alongside another defensive player, such as Gareth Barry at Manchester City or Mark van Bommel for the Dutch national team. In addition to his defensive capabilities and ability to cover ground, De Jong was also a competent passer; he had the highest passing completion percentage in the Premier League in the 2010–11 season out of the top 50 players (90%).

Despite his ability, and reputation as one of the best defensive midfielders in the world at his peak, De Jong has also drawn criticism over his feisty, physical and combative playing style, including from his former Dutch national team manager Van Marwijk. During an international friendly on 3 March 2010, De Jong fractured the leg of Bolton Wanderers' American international Stuart Holden as the result of a late challenge. In the 2010 FIFA World Cup final, he kicked Spanish player Xabi Alonso in the chest, a challenge for which De Jong admitted he was lucky not to have received a red card. On 3 October 2010, in a Premier League match against Newcastle United, a tackle by De Jong on Hatem Ben Arfa resulted in the latter being carried off the pitch with a double fracture of his left tibia and fibula. De Jong was later dropped from the Dutch national team by his coach Van Marwijk for an unspecified period of time, but was later reprieved. During his time at Manchester City, however, De Jong was never shown a red card. Indeed, despite his reputation as an aggressive and hard-tackling player, De Jong's first official direct card of his career came with Milan, in a 1–1 away draw against Verona in Serie A on 13 December 2015; previously, he had only been sent off once in an official game, namely for two bookable offences in a match for Hamburg against Rapid Bucharest in the 2005–06 edition of the UEFA Cup, while his only direct red card had come against Werder Bremen, in the semi-finals of the 2006 DFL-Ligapokal. In April 2016, while playing for the LA Galaxy, De Jong was involved in another controversial incident when a strong takedown led to Portland Timbers midfielder Darlington Nagbe being removed from the field with an injury. The tackle led to a three-game suspension for De Jong, after the disciplinary committee determined the action to have been, "a clear and unequivocal red card".

In December 2013, Spanish football website El Gol Digital ranked De Jong tenth in its list of the world's dirtiest footballers. This style of play earned him a title as the most violent footballer in the world, according to French newspaper L'Équipe.

== Sponsorship ==
In January 2012, De Jong signed a four-year deal with football boot brand Puma.

== Career statistics ==
=== Club ===
As of 2 March 2018

Appearances and goals by club, season and competition
Club	Season	League			National Cup		League Cup		Continental		Total	
Club	Season	Division	Apps	Goals	Apps	Goals	Apps	Goals	Apps	Goals	Apps	Goals
Ajax	2002–03	Eredivisie	17	0	0	0	0	0	10	1	27	1
Ajax	2003–04	Eredivisie	32	2	0	0	0	0	5	0	37	2
Ajax	2004–05	Eredivisie	31	5	0	0	0	0	8	1	39	6
Ajax	2005–06	Eredivisie	16	2	0	0	0	0	7	3	23	5
Ajax	Total		96	9	0	0	0	0	30	5	126	14
Hamburg	2005–06	Bundesliga	12	1	0	0	0	0	3	0	15	1
Hamburg	2006–07	Bundesliga	18	1	0	0	0	0	5	1	23	2
Hamburg	2007–08	Bundesliga	29	1	0	0	0	0	6	1	35	2
Hamburg	2008–09	Bundesliga	7	0	2	0	0	0	2	0	11	0
Hamburg	Total		66	3	2	0	0	0	16	2	84	5
Manchester City	2008–09	Premier League	16	0	0	0	0	0	0	0	16	0
Manchester City	2009–10	Premier League	34	0	3	0	5	0	0	0	42	0
Manchester City	2010–11	Premier League	32	1	4	0	0	0	5	0	41	1
Manchester City	2011–12	Premier League	21	0	1	0	4	1	9	0	36	1
Manchester City	2012–13	Premier League	1	0	0	0	0	0	0	0	2	0
Manchester City	Total		104	1	8	0	9	1	15	0	137	2
A.C. Milan	2012–13	Serie A	12	1	0	0	0	0	4	0	16	1
A.C. Milan	2013–14	Serie A	33	2	1	0	0	0	10	0	44	2
A.C. Milan	2014–15	Serie A	29	3	1	1	0	0	0	0	30	4
A.C. Milan	2015–16	Serie A	5	0	1	0	0	0	0	0	6	0
A.C. Milan	Total		79	6	3	1	0	0	14	0	96	7
LA Galaxy	2016	Major League Soccer	14	0	0	0	1	0	2	0	16	0
Galatasaray	2016–17	Süper Lig	18	1	6	0	0	0	0	0	24	1
Galatasaray	2017–18	Süper Lig	0	0	0	0	0	0	0	0	0	0
Galatasaray	Total		18	1	6	0	0	0	0	0	24	1
Mainz 05	2017–18	Bundesliga	11	0	1	0	0	0	0	0	12	0
Al Ahli	2018–19	Qatar Stars League	21	4	0	0	0	0	0	0	21	4
Al Shahaniya	2019–20	Qatar Stars League	23	0	0	0	4	1	0	0	27	1
Career total			384	20	21	1	10	0	73	7	496	29

=== International ===
As of 28 March 2015

Netherlands
Year	Apps	Goals
2004	5	0
2005	5	0
2006	4	0
2007	5	0
2008	11	0
2009	9	1
2010	11	0
2011	6	0
2012	11	0
2013	2	0
2014	11	0
2015	1	0
Total	81	1

Scores list Netherlands' tally first.

Nigel de Jong: international goals
No.	Date	Venue	Opponent	Score	Result	Competition
1	6 June 2009	Laugardalsvöllur, Reykjavík, Iceland	Iceland	1–0	2–1	2010 FIFA World Cup qualification

== Honours ==
Ajax

- Eredivisie: 2003–04
- Johan Cruyff Shield: 2005

Manchester City

- Premier League: 2011–12
- FA Cup: 2010–11
- FA Community Shield: 2012

Netherlands

- FIFA World Cup runner-up: 2010; third place: 2014

Individual

- Ajax Player of the Year (Rinus Michels Award): 2004–05
