= 2005 Johan Cruyff Shield =

Johan Cruijff Schaal X
PSV Eindhoven	Ajax
1	2
- Date: 5 August 2005
- Venue: Amsterdam Arena, Amsterdam
- Referee: Jan Wegereef
- Attendance: 32,000

The tenth edition of the Johan Cruyff Shield (Dutch: Johan Cruijff Schaal) was held on 5 August 2005 between the 2004–05 Eredivisie and 2004–05 KNVB Cup winners PSV Eindhoven, and Eredivisie runners-up Ajax. Ajax won the match 2–1.

== Match details ==
5 August 2005

PSV Eindhoven	1–2	Ajax
Bouma 51'		Boukhari 72'; Babel 78'

Amsterdam Arena, Amsterdam
Attendance: 32,000
Referee: Jan Wegereef

PSV Eindhoven	Ajax

GK	1	(Brazil) Gomes
RB	2	(Netherlands) André Ooijer
CB	4	(Brazil) Alex
CB	5	(Netherlands) Wilfred Bouma
LB	3	(South Korea) Lee Young-pyo
DM	6	(Belgium) Timmy Simons	(yellow card) 80'
CM	16	(Netherlands) Theo Lucius
CM	8	(Netherlands) Phillip Cocu (c)
RW	17	(Peru) Jefferson Farfán
CF	9	(Netherlands) Jan Vennegoor of Hesselink		(substituted off) 46'
LW	20	(Netherlands) Ibrahim Afellay	(yellow card) 25'
Substitutes:
FW	29	(Brazil) Robert		(substituted on) 46'
Manager:
(Netherlands) Guus Hiddink

GK	12	(South Africa) Hans Vonk
RB	4	(Netherlands) John Heitinga
CB	3	(Czech Republic) Zdeněk Grygera
CB	5	(France) Julien Escudé (c)
LB	19	(Netherlands) Urby Emanuelson
DM	8	(Netherlands) Hedwiges Maduro
CM	16	(Netherlands) Nigel de Jong		(substituted off) 83'
CM	28	(Morocco) Nourdin Boukhari	(yellow card) 71'
RW	10	(South Africa) Steven Pienaar	(yellow card) 19'	(substituted off) 89'
CF	9	(Greece) Angelos Charisteas
LW	11	(Netherlands) Ryan Babel	(yellow card) 76'
Substitutes:
FW	7	(Argentina) Mauro Rosales		(substituted on) 83'
MF	6	(Czech Republic) Tomáš Galásek		(substituted on) 89'
Manager:
(Netherlands) Danny Blind
