= Siniša Gagula =

Bosnian-Herzegovinian footballer

Personal information
- Full name: Siniša Gagula
- Date of birth: 3 January 1984 (age 42)
- Place of birth: Banja Luka, Yugoslavia
- Height: 1.89 m (6 ft 2 in)
- Position: Defender

Youth career
- 2001–2004: Ajax

Senior career*
Years	Team	Apps	(Gls)
2004–2005	Borac Banja Luka		
2005–2006	Slavia Prague II		
2007	Širok Brijeg		
2008–2009	OFI	5	(0)
2009	Borac Banja Luka	5	(0)
2010–2012	Laktaši	0	(0)
- * Club domestic league appearances and goals as of February 10, 2010

Siniša Gagula (born January 3, 1984) is a Bosnian-Herzegovinian retired footballer who last played for FK Laktaši. He also holds Croatian citizenship.

== Club career ==
Gagula has played for OFI and FK Borac Banja Luka. In his early years he played in the Ajax youth system, in a team alongside future Holland international player Hedwiges Maduro.
