= Zdeněk Grygera =

Czech footballer (born 1980)

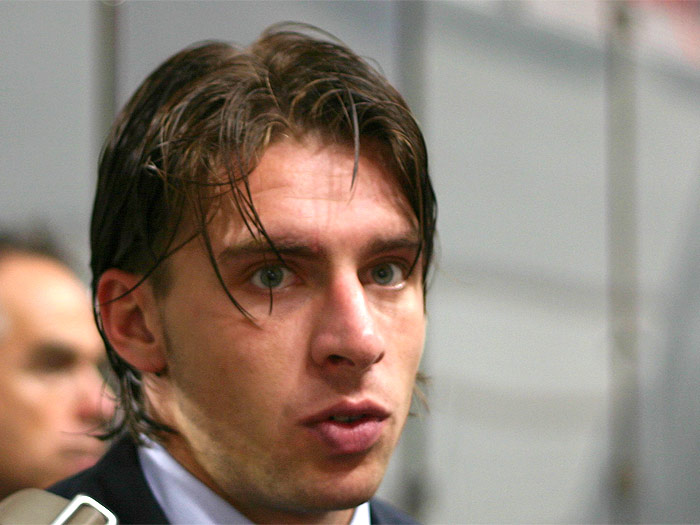

Personal information
- Full name: Zdeněk Grygera
- Date of birth: 14 May 1980 (age 46)
- Place of birth: Přílepy, Czechoslovakia
- Height: 1.84 m (6 ft 1/2 in)
- Position: Defender

Youth career
- 1987–1990: TJ Holešov
- 1990–1997: FK Svit Zlín

Senior career*
| Years | Team | Apps | (Gls) |
| 1997–1998 | Svit Zlín | 20 | (1) |
| 1998–2000 | Petra Drnovice | 54 | (3) |
| 2000–2003 | Sparta Prague | 65 | (2) |
| 2003–2007 | Ajax | 78 | (8) |
| 2007–2011 | Juventus | 87 | (3) |
| 2011–2012 | Fulham | 5 | (0) |
| Total | | 309 | (17) |

International career
| 2001–2009 | Czech Republic | 65 | (2) |
Medal record
Men's football
Representing Czech Republic
UEFA European Championship
| Bronze medal – third place | 2004 Portugal |
UEFA European Under-21 Championship
| Winner | 2002 Switzerland |
- * Club domestic league appearances and goals

Zdeněk Grygera (Czech pronunciation: [ˈzdɛɲɛk ˈɡrɪɡɛra]; born 14 May 1980) is a Czech former professional footballer who played as a defender. He spent his early professional football career in the Czech Republic before moving abroad to play for Ajax in the Netherlands, Juventus in Italy and Fulham in England.

Grygera also represented the Czech Republic national football team at two UEFA European Championships (2004 and 2008) as well as the 2006 FIFA World Cup.

== Club career ==
=== Early club career ===
Grygera began his career at Petra Drnovice before moving to Sparta Prague.

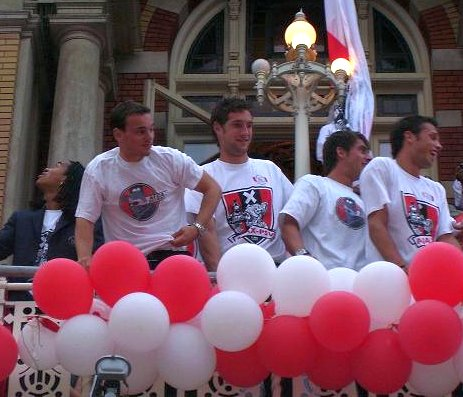
Grygera (fourth from left) played for Ajax from 2003 to 2007.

In July 2003, Grygera was signed by Dutch club Ajax for an undisclosed fee, estimated to be around €3.5 million. His first goal came for the club came in September 2004, a 5–0 thrashing away at Den Bosch. He soon became a fan favorite, especially after scoring against bitter rivals Feyenoord in the April Klassieker.

On 10 January 2007, Ajax Technical Director Martin van Geel announced that Grygera would join Juventus on a Bosman transfer when his contract with Ajax expired in June 2007. He was supposed to transfer after the 2006 FIFA World Cup, but the Calciopoli scandal prevented him from doing so. On 18 April 2009, Grygera scored a last-gasp equalizer in the club's Derby d'Italia fixture against rivals Internazionale.

=== Fulham ===
In summer 2011, Grygera still had one year left to run on his contract at Juventus, but it was rescinded by mutual consent the same year on 30 August. The following day, he joined Premier League club Fulham. He received the number 26 jersey and made his Fulham debut on 15 September 2011 in the UEFA Europa League against Twente. Grygera suffered an anterior cruciate ligament rupture during a league match against Tottenham Hotspur on 6 November 2011, which kept him out for the rest of the season.

Grygera's contract with Fulham was up for renewal at the end of the 2011–12 season. Manager Martin Jol said: "Hopefully he can prove himself before the end of August. If he proves he's, fit I would like to keep him." On 6 December 2012, Jol confirmed that Grygera had decided to retire from football to concentrate instead on returning to full fitness.

== International career ==
Grygera was part of the which won the UEFA U-21 Championships in 2002. In 2001, he debuted for the senior squad during a friendly match against South Korea. At the 2006 FIFA World Cup, Grygera's run and cross set up the opening goal for Jan Koller in the Czechs' first match against the United States, which they 3–0. At UEFA Euro 2008 Grygera was involved in a rough challenge with Swiss striker Alexander Frei during the first half of the tournament's opening game, which tore Frei's knee ligaments and forced the person out for the rest of the tournament.

== Style of play ==
Grygera was known for his work-rate, competitiveness, and versatility, and usually played as a full-back, wing-back, or winger along right flank, although he was also capable of playing on the left, or as a centre-back; while being solid defensively, he was also known for his ability to get forward and for his all-round good quality of play.

== Honours ==
Sparta Prague

- Gambrinus Liga: 2000–01, 2002–03

Ajax

- Eredivisie: 2003–04
- KNVB Cup: 2005–06, 2006–07
- Johan Cruijff Shield: 2005
