= Nourdin Boukhari =

Moroccan footballer

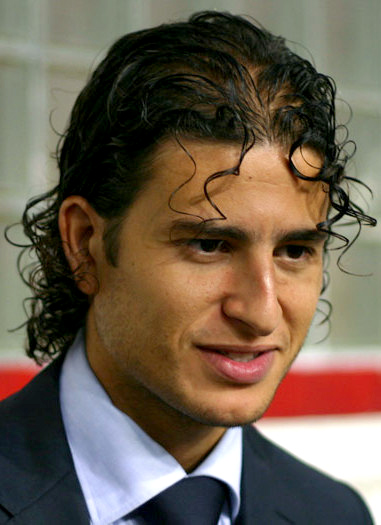

Personal information
- Date of birth: 30 June 1980 (age 46)
- Place of birth: Rotterdam, Netherlands
- Height: 1.90 m (6 ft 3 in)
- Positions: Attacking midfielder; winger

Team information
- Current team: Almere City (assistant manager)

Youth career
- Neptunus
- RVV HOV
- Sparta

Senior career*
| Years | Team | Apps | (Gls) |
| 2000–2002 | Sparta | 76 | (13) |
| 2002–2006 | Ajax | 69 | (14) |
| 2003–2004 | → NAC (loan) | 28 | (5) |
| 2006–2007 | Nantes | 9 | (2) |
| 2007 | → AZ (loan) | 10 | (0) |
| 2007–2008 | Sparta | 32 | (8) |
| 2008 | Al-Ittihad | 0 | (0) |
| 2009 | NAC | 17 | (5) |
| 2009–2012 | Kasımpaşa | 7 | (0) |
| 2010–2011 | → Wisła Kraków (loan) | 9 | (1) |
| 2012 | NAC | 10 | (2) |
| 2012–2013 | RKC | 26 | (1) |
| 2014 | Sparta | 11 | (0) |
| 2014–2015 | Magreb '90 | 11 | (2) |
| Total | | 315 | (53) |

International career
| 2001–2007 | Morocco | 14 | (2) |

Managerial career
- 2015–2018: Sparta (academy)
- 2021–2025: Sparta (assistant)
- 2025-: Almere City (assistant)
- * Club domestic league appearances and goals

Nourdin Boukhari (Arabic: نور الدين البخاري; born 30 June 1980) is a former professional footballer who played as a midfielder. After retiring, he worked as a youth coach, and is the current assistant coach of Eredivisie club Sparta Rotterdam. Born in the Netherlands, he represented Morocco at international level.

== Club career ==
He started his career for Sparta where he stood out for his technical skill and subsequently signed for Ajax, where he made his debut against Groningen on 1 September 2002. For the 2003–04 season, he was loaned to NAC Breda. After his contract had expired in 2006, he joined French league side Nantes. However, his stay with the French side turned out to be a disappointment, so he was sent on loan to AZ in January 2007. Although not unsuccessful, AZ chose not to buy him and Boukhari returned to Nantes, which was relegated to the Ligue 2. Boukhari was reluctant to play in the second division and on 7 July he returned to Sparta Rotterdam, where he signed a contract for three years. Back at the club where it all started for him, Boukhari became club captain and the face of the 100-year anniversary of the club.

After spending a season with Sparta Rotterdam, Boukhari was approached early in the transfer window by Saudi Arabian club Al-Ittihad. However, the Saudi Arabian side then refused to pay the transfer fee to Sparta, instead of paying the fee, sending a lawyer to declare that they wanted to cancel the deal. Al-Ittihad manager Gabriel Calderón was reportedly unhappy about Boukhari's lack of match fitness, and asked the board to cancel the transfer. However, the Eredivisie side wanted the transfer to go through: "The transfer is a done deal and we expect to receive the money into our account," said director Peter Bonthuis. The Rotterdam side submitted a complaint to FIFA regarding the Saudi Arabian club's sudden change of action.

In January 2009, Boukhari signed a contract until the end of the season with NAC Breda. In July 2009, he signed three-year deal with Turkish side Kasımpaşa. He was sent on loan to Polish side Wisła Kraków for the 2010–11 season. After his contract with Kasimpasa had been dissolved, Boukhari signed an amateur deal with NAC Breda until the end of the season. After he had left as a free agent, he again signed an amateur deal with RKC Waalwijk in September 2012, which was turned into a paid deal in January 2013. However, he was released at the end of the season. In January 2014, he signed with Sparta Rotterdam, with which he almost promoted to the Eredivisie. He retired from professional football in June 2014 and became a member of the staff, being responsible for the team's strikers. He started playing for the Hoofdklasse side Magreb '90.

== International career ==
Boukhari chose to represent Morocco in international football. He made his international debut in a November 2001 friendly match against Zambia.

== Career statistics ==
=== International ===
Appearances and goals by national team and year
| National team | Year | Apps | Goals |
|---|---|---|---|
| Morocco | 2001 | 1 | 0 |
| Morocco | 2002 | 3 | 0 |
| Morocco | 2003 | 1 | 0 |
| Morocco | 2004 | 1 | 1 |
| Morocco | 2005 | 2 | 0 |
| Morocco | 2006 | 3 | 1 |
| Morocco | 2007 | 3 | 0 |
| Total | | 14 | 2 |

Scores and results list Morocco's goal tally first, score column indicates score after each Boukhari goal.

List of international goals scored by Nourdin Boukhari
| No. | Date | Venue | Opponent | Score | Result | Competition | Ref. |
|---|---|---|---|---|---|---|---|
| 1 | 17 November 2004 | Prince Moulay Abdellah Stadium, Rabat, Morocco | Burkina Faso | 2–0 | 4–0 | Friendly | |
| 2 | 15 November 2006 | Prince Moulay Abdellah Stadium, Rabat, Morocco | Gabon | 4–0 | 6–0 | Friendly | |

== Honours ==
Ajax

- KNVB Cup: 2005–06
- Johan Cruyff Shield: 2002, 2005

Wisła Kraków

- Ekstraklasa: 2010–11

== Personal life ==
He is the step-father to Galatasaray and Netherlands international winger Noa Lang.
