= Jan Wegereef =

Dutch football referee

Jan Wegereef in 2008

Jan Willem Wegereef (born 17 January 1962 in Rijssen) is a former top-level Dutch football (soccer) referee, living in Hellevoetsluis. He refereed one match at the 2002 World Cup and has officiated a total of 12 UEFA Champions League matches (as of 6 November 2006). As of 2008, he had officiated in 42 matches across all UEFA competitions. He also officiated the 2006–07 Saudi Premier League final.

Wegereef officiated in numerous international competitions, including the 1999 FIFA World Youth Championship and qualifying matches for the 2002 World Cup, 2006 World Cup, Euro 2000, and Euro 2008. He is known to have served as a FIFA referee during the period from 1996 to 2007.
