= Everton F.C. End of Season Awards =

Sports award

The Everton Player of the Season award is an official award given by Everton Football Club to the best performing player from the club over the course of the season. The award is given based on votes by Everton supporters on the club's website.

The inaugural award was given to Spanish midfielder Mikel Arteta in 2006, and it has been presented every season since. The award has been given to 15 different players over the course of 21 seasons, with four players being awarded on more than one occasion. Of these four players, only Jordan Pickford has won the award four times, in 2018 and in three consecutive seasons between 2022 and 2024. In 2010, South African winger Steven Pienaar became the first player from outside of Europe to win the award.

== Player of the Season Award ==
=== Winners ===
The Fans' Player of the season is determined through a vote on the Everton website in which five candidates are nominated by the club. Fans are then free to vote for their player of choice. The player with the greatest number of votes wins the award. This award has been presented from 2006 onward.

Season	Player	Position
2005–06	(Spain) Mikel Arteta	Midfielder
2006–07	(Spain) Mikel Arteta	Midfielder
2007–08	(England) Joleon Lescott	Defender
2008–09	(England) Phil Jagielka	Defender
2009–10	(South Africa) Steven Pienaar	Midfielder
2010–11	(England) Leighton Baines	Defender
2011–12	(Netherlands) John Heitinga	Defender
2012–13	(England) Leighton Baines	Defender
2013–14	(Republic of Ireland) Séamus Coleman	Defender
2014–15	(England) Phil Jagielka	Defender
2015–16	(England) Gareth Barry	Midfielder
2016–17	(Belgium) Romelu Lukaku	Forward
2017–18	(England) **Jordan Pickford**	Goalkeeper
2018–19	(France) Lucas Digne	Defender
2019–20	(Brazil) Richarlison	Forward
2020–21	(England) Dominic Calvert-Lewin	Forward
2021–22	(England) **Jordan Pickford**	Goalkeeper
2022–23	(England) **Jordan Pickford**	Goalkeeper
2023–24	(England) **Jordan Pickford**	Goalkeeper
2024–25	(Senegal) **Idrissa Gueye**	Midfielder
2025–26	(England) **James Garner**	Midfielder

- Notes: Players in **bold** are still playing for Everton.

=== Wins by player ===
Player	Total wins	Season(s)
(England) Jordan Pickford	4	2017–18, 2021–22, 2022–23, 2023–24
(Spain) Mikel Arteta	2	2005–06, 2006–07
(England) Phil Jagielka	2	2008–09, 2014–15
(England) Leighton Baines	2	2010–11, 2012–13
(England) Joleon Lescott	1	2007–08
(South Africa) Steven Pienaar	1	2009–10
(Netherlands) John Heitinga	1	2011–12
(Republic of Ireland) Séamus Coleman	1	2013–14
(England) Gareth Barry	1	2015–16
(Belgium) Romelu Lukaku	1	2016–17
(France) Lucas Digne	1	2018–19
(Brazil) Richarlison	1	2019–20
(England) Dominic Calvert-Lewin	1	2020–21
(Senegal) Idrissa Gueye	1	2024–25
(England) James Garner	1	2025–26

=== Wins by playing position ===
Position	Number of wins
Defender	8
Midfielder	6
Goalkeeper	4
Forward	3

=== Wins by nationality ===
Winner	Number of winners
England	12
Spain	2
South Africa	1
Netherlands	1
Republic of Ireland	1
Belgium	1
France	1
Brazil	1
Senegal	1

== Players' Player of the Season Award ==
The Players' player of the season award is given to the player at the club with the greatest number of votes from teammates. This award has been presented from the 2005–06 season onwards.

Season	Player	Position
2005–06	(Spain) Mikel Arteta	Midfielder
2006–07	(England) Joleon Lescott	Defender
2007–08	(England) Joleon Lescott	Defender
2008–09	(England) Phil Jagielka	Defender
2009–10	(England) Leighton Baines	Defender
2010–11	(England) Leighton Baines	Defender
2011–12	(France) Sylvain Distin	Defender
2012–13	(England) Leighton Baines	Defender
2013–14	(Republic of Ireland) Séamus Coleman	Defender
2014–15	(England) Phil Jagielka	Defender
2015–16	(England) Gareth Barry	Midfielder
2016–17	(Belgium) Romelu Lukaku	Forward
2017–18	(England) **Jordan Pickford**	Goalkeeper
2018–19	(France) Lucas Digne	Defender
2018–19	(Senegal) **Idrissa Gueye**	Midfielder
2019–20	(England) Mason Holgate	Defender
2020–21	(England) Dominic Calvert-Lewin	Forward
2021–22	(England) Anthony Gordon	Forward
2022–23	(Nigeria) Alex Iwobi	Midfielder
2023–24	(England) **Jarrad Branthwaite**	Defender
2024–25	(Senegal) **Idrissa Gueye**	Midfielder
2025–26	(England) **James Garner**	Midfielder

- Notes: Players in **bold** are still playing for Everton.

== Young Player of the Season Award ==
Season	Player	Position
2005–06	(Scotland) James McFadden	Forward
2006–07	(England) James Vaughan	Forward
2007–08	(Nigeria) Victor Anichebe	Forward
2008–09	(Belgium) Marouane Fellaini	Midfielder
2009–10	(England) Jack Rodwell	Defender
2010–11	(Republic of Ireland) Séamus Coleman	Defender
2011–12	(Greece) Apostolos Vellios	Forward
2012–13	(England) Ross Barkley	Midfielder
2013–14	(England) Ross Barkley	Midfielder
2014–15	(England) John Stones	Defender
2015–16	(Belgium) Romelu Lukaku	Forward
2016–17	(England) Tom Davies	Midfielder
2017–18	(England) **Jordan Pickford**	Goalkeeper
2018–19	(Brazil) Richarlison	Forward
2019–20	(England) Mason Holgate	Defender
2020–21	(England) Ben Godfrey	Defender
2021–22	(England) Anthony Gordon	Forward
2022–23	(England) **Dwight McNeil**	Midfielder
2023–24	(England) **Jarrad Branthwaite**	Defender
2024–25	(England) **Jarrad Branthwaite**	Defender
2025–26	(England) **Harrison Armstrong**	Midfielder

- Notes: Players in **bold** are still playing for Everton.

== Greatest Ever team ==
At the start of the 2003–04 season, as part of the club's official celebration of their 125th anniversary, supporters cast votes to determine the greatest ever Everton team.

== Everton Giants ==
In 2000, Everton selected 11 "Giants", and initially one additional giant was added per year, until two were added in 2020, then no more were added until 2025 when a further four were added and an additional one added in 2026.

Year Awarded	Player	Position
2000	(England) Jack Sharp	Midfielder
2000	(England) Sam Chedgzoy	Midfielder
2000	(England) Dixie Dean	Forward
2000	(England) Ted Sagar	Goalkeeper
2000	(England) Tommy Jones	Defender
2000	(England) Dave Hickson	Forward
2000	(Scotland) Alex Young	Forward
2000	(England) Bob Latchford	Forward
2000	(Wales) Neville Southall	Goalkeeper
2000	(England) Dave Watson	Defender
2000	(England) **Howard Kendall**	Midfielder
2001	(England) Alan Ball	Midfielder
2002	(England) Ray Wilson	Defender
2003	(Wales) Kevin Ratcliffe	Defender
2004	(England) **Joe Royle**	Forward
2005	(Scotland) Graeme Sharp	Forward
2006	(England) Peter Reid	Midfielder
2007	(England) **Colin Harvey**	Midfielder
2008	(England) Gordon West	Goalkeeper
2009	(England) **Harry Catterick**	Forward
2010	(England) Trevor Steven	Midfielder
2011	(Scotland) Duncan Ferguson	Forward
2012	(England) Brian Labone	Defender
2013	(England) Derek Temple	Forward
2014	(England) Bobby Collins	Midfielder
2015	(England) Mick Lyons	Defender
2016	(England) Tommy Wright	Defender
2017	(Wales) Roy Vernon	Forward
2018	(England) Adrian Heath	Forward
2019	(England) David Unsworth	Defender
2020	(England) Gary Stevens	Defender
2020	(Wales) Pat Van Den Hauwe	Defender
2025	(England) Paul Bracewell	Midfielder
2025	(Scotland) Andy Gray	Forward
2025	(England) Derek Mountfield	Defender
2025	(Republic of Ireland) Kevin Sheedy	Midfielder
2026	(England) Leighton Baines	Defender

- Notes: Players in **bold** both played for and had a permanent manager position at Everton.
