= Steven Pienaar =

South African footballer (born 1982)

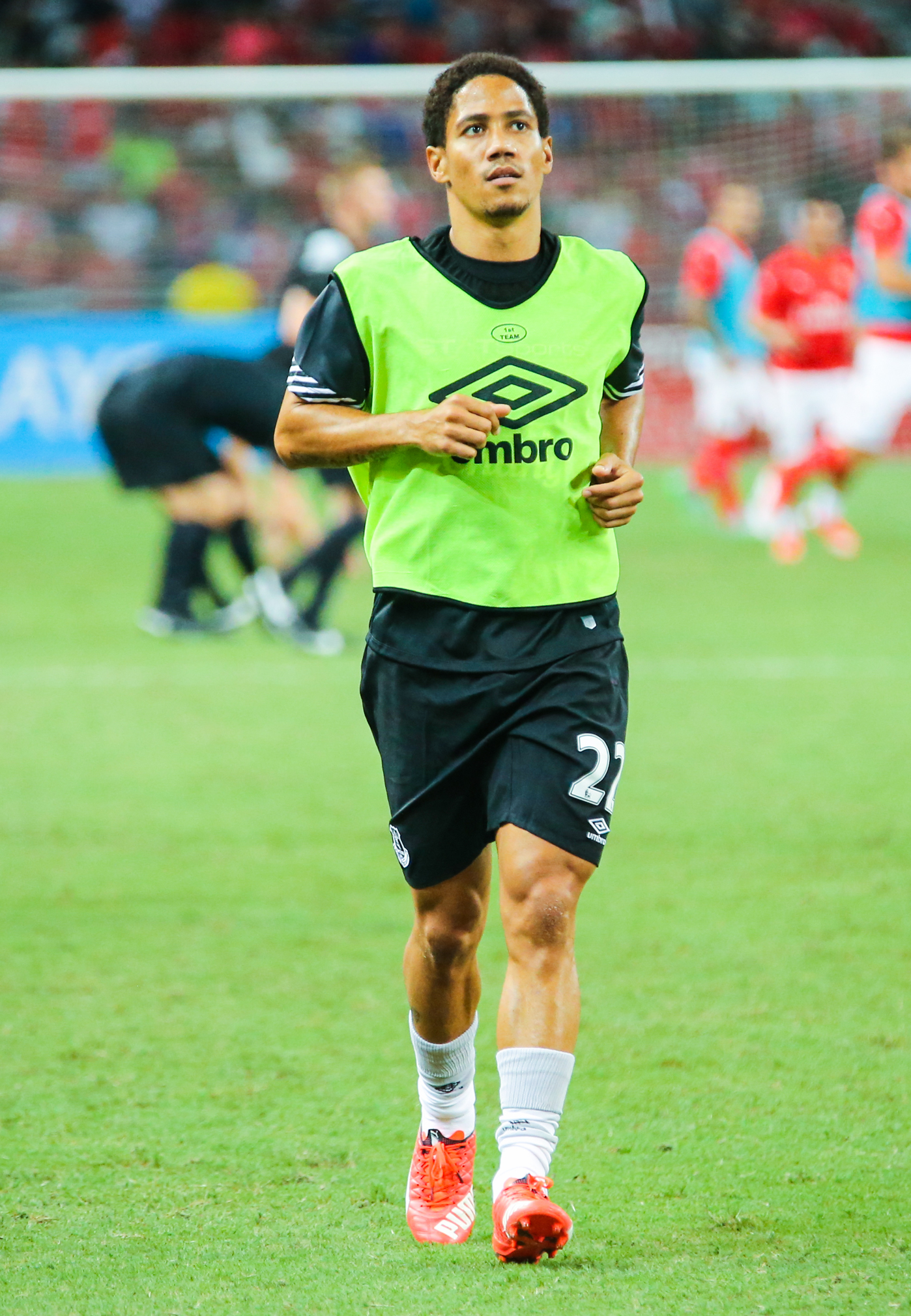
- Pienaar warming-up for Everton in 2015

Personal information
- Full name: Steven Jerome Pienaar
- Date of birth: 17 March 1982 (age 44)
- Place of birth: Johannesburg, South Africa
- Height: 1.70 m (5 ft 7 in)
- Positions: Winger; attacking midfielder

Team information
- Current team: Sharjah FC (youth)

Youth career
- West Ham Westbury
- Westbury Arsenal
- School of Excellence
- Ajax Cape Town

Senior career*
Years	Team	Apps	(Gls)
1999–2001	Ajax Cape Town	24	(6)
2001–2006	Ajax	94	(15)
2006–2008	Borussia Dortmund	25	(0)
2007–2008	→ Everton (loan)	28	(2)
2008–2011	Everton	76	(7)
2011–2012	Tottenham Hotspur	10	(0)
2012	→ Everton (loan)	14	(4)
2012–2016	Everton	71	(7)
2016–2017	Sunderland	15	(0)
2017–2018	Bidvest Wits	4	(0)
Total		361	(41)

International career
1999–2000	South Africa U17	1	(0)
2002–2012	South Africa	61	(3)

Managerial career
- 2019–2020: SV Robinhood (assistant)
- 2020–2024: Ajax (youth)
- 2024–: Sharjah (youth)
- * Club domestic league appearances and goals

Steven Jerome Pienaar (Afrikaans pronunciation: [ˈstivən ˈpinɑːr]; born 17 March 1982) is a South African former professional footballer and current coach of the U14 team of Sharjah FC in the United Arab Emirates.

He hails from Westbury, a suburb in Johannesburg's Westrand. He was a captain of the South African national team. He primarily played as a winger, but also played as an attacking midfielder. Pienaar played at club level in South Africa, the Netherlands, Germany, and England for Ajax Cape Town, Ajax, Borussia Dortmund, Everton, Tottenham Hotspur, Sunderland and Bidvest Wits. Pienaar is currently serving as an international ambassador at former club Everton.

A former under-17 international, Pienaar made his international debut for South Africa in a 2–0 win against Turkey in 2002. He earned 62 caps and scored three goals over the course of his international career. Pienaar participated at the 2002 and 2010 World Cups, the latter on home soil.

== Club career ==
=== Ajax Cape Town ===
Pienaar was born in Johannesburg. He started his professional career at Ajax Cape Town, some 1,400 kilometres (870 mi) away from his hometown. He was brought to the attention of Ajax CT whilst playing for the School of Excellence and was asked to join their youth academy.

Pienaar said, "I was very fortunate to go to the School of Excellence 2000, to be able to polish the technique and the talent that God gave me and to learn how to use it in the way that God had wanted me to." "I was fortunate to work with the Dutch coach Leo van Veen, who helped me at Ajax Cape Town... He appreciated the way I played but at the same time he changed my mentality. He taught me how to prepare for games, not just playing to please the crowd but also how to play for the team."

At Ajax Cape Town, he won the Rothman's Cup after beating Orlando Pirates 4–1 in the final on 13 December 2000, his final game for the club.

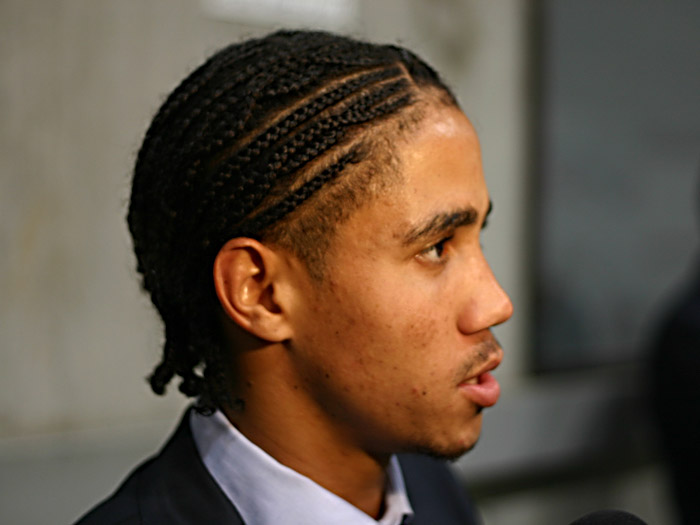
Pienaar with Ajax

=== Ajax ===
At the age of 18, Pienaar was brought over to the Netherlands in January 2001 but did not make his Eredivisie debut until 24 February 2002, a 1–0 victory over NAC Breda. He became a pivotal member of the Ajax team that won the Dutch League in 2002 and 2004, shining as one of Ajax's best players alongside Zlatan Ibrahimović, Maxwell, Cristian Chivu, Mido, Nigel de Jong, Rafael van der Vaart, and Wesley Sneijder, as well as future Everton teammates John Heitinga and Andy van der Meyde.

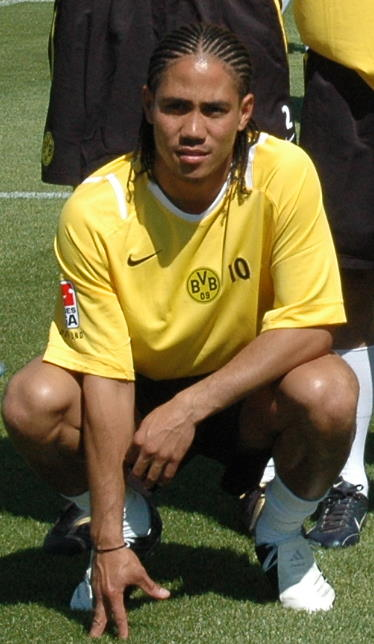
Pienaar with Borussia Dortmund

=== Borussia Dortmund ===
In January 2006, German club Borussia Dortmund of the Bundesliga signed Pienaar on a three-year contract from Ajax. Seen as a replacement for the Arsenal-bound Tomáš Rosický, Pienaar's first year with Dortmund saw him receive the number 10 shirt vacated by the Czech playmaker. Pienaar, however, struggled at Dortmund and never felt truly accepted by the other players at the club.

=== Everton ===
Pienaar joined Everton on loan for the 2007–08 and later signed a three-year contract from Dortmund for a pre-agreed fee of £2 million after payment of an initial loan fee of £350,000 in April 2008. Pienaar made his debut for Everton in a 2–1 home victory over Wigan Athletic on 11 August 2007, replacing Leon Osman in the 73rd minute as a substitute. Pienaar scored his first Everton goal in a 2–0 home victory over Middlesbrough on 30 September. He produced some stand out performances and this led to many clubs showing interest in him.

Despite missing 11 games through injury, Pienaar was named Everton's Player of the Season for 2009–10.

=== Tottenham Hotspur ===
In January 2011, both Chelsea and Tottenham Hotspur had bids accepted to buy Pienaar from Everton before the South African joined Spurs for a fee of £3 million on a four-year contract. He made his Tottenham debut in a 1–1 draw away to Newcastle United. In August 2011, Pienaar suffered a groin injury, which ruled him out for six weeks. Pienaar scored his first goal for Spurs in a 4–0 victory over Irish side Shamrock Rovers in the Europa League on 15 December.

Pienaar's spell at Tottenham was characterised by persistent injuries and not much impact in games, which resulted him rarely featuring in the team.

=== Return to Everton ===
Late on transfer deadline day in January 2012, Pienaar completed a return to Everton on a six-month loan deal. He made his second debut for the club in a 1–1 draw away to Wigan Athletic, and scored his first goal of his loan spell with opener in a 2–0 win over Chelsea a week later. Pienaar finished the season by scoring against Newcastle United, stating in a post-match interview his wish to rejoin Everton. Despite only playing in 14 games, and being cup-tied from the FA Cup, Pienaar finished his spell with six assists, the most of anyone at Everton for the season. He also scored four goals, which was at the time his joint-best tally in the league for Everton.

A permanent transfer was agreed in July 2012, with Everton paying Tottenham a fee of £4.5 million. On 25 August 2012, he scored his first goal since signing permanently, opening the scoring in a 1–3 away win against Aston Villa. On 9 December, Pienaar scored a powerful header against former club Tottenham, Everton's 1,000th goal in the Premier League, as they came from a goal down to win 2–1 at Goodison. Pienaar was sent off for two bookable offences twice during the season, against Queens Park Rangers and Manchester City. Everton drew 1–1 against QPR and beat City 2–0. Pienaar finished the season with seven goals, the joint-most he has ever scored in a season with Everton. In October 2013, Pienaar returned from a hamstring injury suffered two months earlier as he came on as a substitute against Hull City and scored the winning goal just ten seconds later. Despite Everton finishing the 2013–14 season fifth with a club record of 72 Premier League points, Pienaar struggled with injuries for large parts of it and only scored one goal and made two assists in the matches he did feature in.

Pienaar made relatively few appearances over the next two seasons and, at the end of 2015–16, he was released by Everton when his contract expired.

=== Late career ===
On 19 August 2016, Pienaar signed a one-year contract with Sunderland, reuniting with former manager David Moyes. He made 17 appearances and his contract was not renewed at the end of the season. He returned to South Africa, signing a one-year deal with Bidvest Wits in July 2017, but was released six months later. He retired from professional football in March 2018.

Steven signed for amateur football club Dubai Allstars in Dubai, UAE. The move was masterminded by Niklas Wikström, an influential local agent, who also signed Swedish international Christian Willhelmsson to the same club in 2019.

== International career ==
Pienaar represented South Africa at every youth level from Under-17 onwards. He was called up to the South Africa Under-20 by head coach Augusto Palacios for the 2001 African Youth Championship in Ethiopia. A month after returning from the tournament, he received his first call-up to the senior national team for a friendly against Italy in April 2001, before being recalled by Jomo Sono almost a year later for another friendly against Saudi Arabia on 20 March 2002, although he remained an unused substitute. Pienaar made his senior debut on 23 May 2002 in a friendly against Turkey, South Africa’s final preparation match before the 2002 FIFA World Cup. Sono subsequently included him in the World Cup squad, making him the youngest South African player to be selected for the World Cup. However, he remained an unused substitute throughout the competition as South Africa were eliminated in the group stage.

After the World Cup, Pienaar's involvement with the national team began to decline as his role at Ajax increased. His growing club commitments limited his availability for international duty, and he consequently missed the 2002 COSAFA Cup, which South Africa won. He would return to the national team setup in November 2002, being called into camp that month, although he remained without a further appearance. He eventually earned his second cap on 29 March 2003, starting in a 2–0 victory over Madagascar. He went on to make his competitive debut on 22 June, starting in a 2–1 win over Ivory Coast in a 2004 African Cup of Nations qualifier. However, a knee injury sustained later that year ruled him out of South Africa’s squad for the finals in Tunisia.

Following his return to the national team after the tournament, Pienaar developed into an influential midfielder. He established himself in the side during the 2006 FIFA World Cup qualifying campaign, scoring against Burkina Faso and Uganda. Pienaar’s goals, however, were not enough as South Africa failed to qualify for the 2006 FIFA World Cup. They nevertheless qualified for the 2006 Africa Cup of Nations after finishing among the top three teams in their World Cup qualifying group. Pienaar was once again unable to participate in the tournament because of injury, with coach Ted Dumitru leaving him out of the final squad.

Now regarded as one of the celebrated stars of the South African team, Pienaar returned to international duty in mid-2006 and helped the side qualify for the 2008 Africa Cup of Nations in Ghana. Carlos Alberto Parreira subsequently selected him in his 23-man squad for the tournament, but his club, Everton, initially withheld his release to keep him available for club duties. SAFA referred the matter to FIFA, which ruled that Everton had to release the midfielder for international duty. Pienaar arrived at the national team's camp two days after the deadline, and his delayed arrival became a contentious issue at a press conference, which he later walked out of.

He featured in both of South Africa's opening group matches, starting in the 1–1 draw with Angola before assisting Katlego Mphela's consolation goal in a 3–1 loss to Tunisia. He was, however, forced to withdraw from the tournament after sustaining an ankle injury in training before the final group fixture against Senegal. His withdrawal prompted reports questioning the legitimacy of his injury, with suggestions that he had sought an early return to England, allegations he denied.

In South Africa's subsequent qualifying campaign for the 2010 Africa Cup of Nations, Pienaar made four appearances as the team attempted to secure a place in the tournament. However, Nigeria proved too strong for South Africa, who nevertheless defeated Equatorial Guinea both home and away finished as runners-up in their group, missing out on the competition for the first time since the 1994 edition.

Following the team's failure to qualify, Pienaar's involvement with the national team was disrupted by a broken toe. After recovering, he was selected for a friendly against Cameroon but withdrew through injury. SAFA subsequently suggested that he was attempting to avoid international duty, a claim denied by his club manager, David Moyes, who provided scans confirming the injury. Pienaar was called up again in February 2009 but withdrew after sustaining another injury shortly before the match against Liverpool.

He returned to international duty in March 2009, featuring in friendlies against Norway and Portugal as South Africa prepared to host the 2009 FIFA Confederations Cup. He was included in the tournament squad but suffered another setback when he limped off during a 1–0 friendly win over Poland on 6 June. He consequently began South Africa's opening match against Iraq on the bench, entering as a second-half substitute in a goalless draw. Pienaar returned to the starting line-up for the following match against New Zealand, helping create the opportunities that led to both goals in a 2–0 victory. He remained in the starting eleven as South Africa progressed to the semi-finals, where they lost 1–0 to Brazil. Pienaar played the full match and was named man of the match. The hosts eventually finished fourth, and his performances throughout the competition earned him the South African Player of the Year award for 2009.

As hosts of the 2010 FIFA World Cup, South Africa qualified automatically and prepared for the tournament through a series of friendly matches. Although Pienaar's appearances for the national team declined due to club commitments, he remained a regular selection when available. However, his participation in the tournament was threatened by a knee injury sustained following a challenge by compatriot and national team captain Aaron Mokoena in a league match against Portsmouth. Despite the setback, Pienaar continued to impress in the Premier League, raising hopes that he would play an important role in South Africa's World Cup campaign on home soil.

He was subsequently named in coach Carlos Alberto Parreira's squad for the 2010 FIFA World Cup, becoming one of four members of the 2002 squad to be named in the 2010 squad, along with Aaron Mokoena, Macbeth Sibaya and Siyabonga Nomvethe. Pienaar earned his 50th international cap in a 1–0 friendly victory over Denmark on 5 June 2010 before starting South Africa's opening World Cup match against Mexico on 11 June. He also started the subsequent match against Uruguay but was substituted in the 79th minute for goalkeeper Moeneeb Josephs after Itumeleng Khune was sent off in the 3–0 defeat. Pienaar retained his place in the starting line-up for the final group match against France, which South Africa won 2–1. However, the result was insufficient to secure progression to the knockout stage, making South Africa the first host nation to be eliminated in the group stage of a FIFA World Cup.

Parreira resigned following the tournament and was succeeded by his assistant, Pitso Mosimane. Under Mosimane, Pienaar emerged as a potential successor to Aaron Mokoena as national captain, with several media reports identifying him as a candidate for the role. Mosimane appointed him captain after dropping Mokoena from the squad, initially on an interim basis. However, injuries limited his participation in South Africa's qualifying campaign for the 2012 Africa Cup of Nations. The team ultimately failed to qualify after finishing behind Niger on the head-to-head record, despite both sides being level on points.

Pienaar continued to represent South Africa for a further year before announcing his retirement from international football in October 2012, following the country's second 2014 FIFA World Cup qualifying match. Despite requests from newly appointed coach Gordon Igesund, Pienaar declined to reverse his decision ahead of the 2013 Africa Cup of Nations.

== Coaching career ==
After retiring, Pienaar began coaching at Dutch amateur club SV Robinhood under head coach Nana Tutu, who formerly worked for AFC Ajax to help African players in the club. In September 2019, he completed his UEFA A Licence and in December 2019, Pienaar returned to AFC Ajax as a Trainee Coach.

== Personal life ==
Pienaar is from the mixed-race South African community known as Coloureds. He is commonly referred to by his nickname "Schillo" in South Africa, a childhood nickname given to him by friends after the exploits of Totò Schillaci during the 1990 World Cup.

=== Controversy ===
Pienaar's ex-girlfriend Danielle Steeneveld attempted to sue Pienaar for ZAR10.8million in August 2009 for not marrying her. Pienaar was charged with drunk-driving and failure to comply with a traffic sign in central Liverpool in February 2010. He was subsequently found guilty of driving whilst under the influence of alcohol and was banned from driving for 12 months.

In April 2012, a warrant was issued for Pienaar's arrest after he failed to appear before Chelmsford Magistrate's court on two counts of speeding.

=== Advertising ===
In the run up to the 2010 World Cup in South Africa, Pienaar was involved in a high-profile Adidas sportswear advertising campaign.

== Career statistics ==
=== Club ===
As of match played 31 December 2016.

Club	Season	League			National Cup		League Cup		Continental		Other		Total	
Club	Season	Division	Apps	Goals	Apps	Goals	Apps	Goals	Apps	Goals	Apps	Goals	Apps	Goals
Ajax Cape Town	1999–2000	Premier Soccer League	13	5	0	0	0	0	–		–		13	5
Ajax Cape Town	2000–01	Premier Soccer League	11	1	0	0	0	0	–		–		11	1
Ajax Cape Town	Total		24	6	0	0	0	0	–		–		24	6
Ajax	2001–02	Eredivisie	8	1	0	0	–		0	0	0	0	8	1
Ajax	2002–03	Eredivisie	31	5	2	0	–		12	2	0	0	45	7
Ajax	2003–04	Eredivisie	16	3	0	0	–		5	0	0	0	21	3
Ajax	2004–05	Eredivisie	24	4	2	0	–		4	0	1	1	31	5
Ajax	2005–06	Eredivisie	15	2	0	0	–		9	0	2	0	26	2
Ajax	Total		94	15	4	0	–		30	2	3	1	131	18
Borussia Dortmund	2006–07	Bundesliga	25	0	2	0	–		–		–		27	0
Everton (loan)	2007–08	Premier League	28	2	1	0	3	0	8	0	–		40	2
Everton	2008–09	Premier League	28	2	6	0	0	0	1	0	–		35	2
Everton	2009–10	Premier League	30	4	2	0	0	0	6	3	–		38	7
Everton	2010–11	Premier League	18	1	0	0	2	0	0	0	–		20	1
Everton	Total		104	9	9	0	5	0	15	3	–		133	12
Tottenham Hotspur	2010–11	Premier League	8	0	1	0	0	0	2	0	–		11	0
Tottenham Hotspur	2011–12	Premier League	2	0	2	0	0	0	3	1	–		7	1
Tottenham Hotspur	Total		10	0	3	0	0	0	5	1	–		18	1
Everton (loan)	2011–12	Premier League	14	4	–		–		–		–		14	4
Everton	2012–13	Premier League	35	6	4	1	1	0	0	0	–		40	7
Everton	2013–14	Premier League	23	1	2	0	0	0	0	0	–		25	1
Everton	2014–15	Premier League	9	0	0	0	0	0	2	0	–		11	0
Everton	2015–16	Premier League	4	0	2	0	0	0	0	0	–		6	0
Everton	Total		85	11	7	1	2	0	2	0	–		96	12
Sunderland	2016–17	Premier League	15	0	0	0	2	0	–		–		17	0
Career total			357	41	26	1	8	0	52	6	3	1	447	49

== Honours ==
Ajax

- Eredivisie: 2001–02, 2003–04
- KNVB Cup: 2001–02

Everton

- FA Cup runner-up: 2008–09

Individual

- Ajax CT Young Player of the Season: 2000
- Ajax Talent of the Year (Marco van Basten Award): 2002–03
- UEFA Champions League top assist provider: 2005–06
- SAFA Player of the Year: 2009
- Everton Player of the Season: 2009–10
