= Leighton Baines =

English footballer (born 1984)

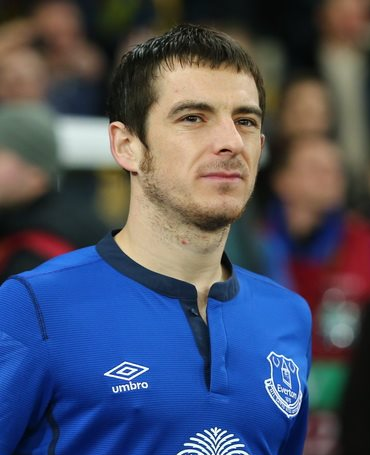
- Baines playing for Everton in 2015

Personal information
- Full name: Leighton John Baines
- Date of birth: 11 December 1984 (age 41)
- Place of birth: Kirkby, Merseyside, England
- Height: 5 ft 7 in (1.70 m)
- Position: Left-back

Team information
- Current team: Everton U18

Youth career
- Everton
- Wigan Athletic

Senior career*
Years	Team	Apps	(Gls)
2002–2007	Wigan Athletic	145	(4)
2007–2020	Everton	348	(29)
Total		493	(33)

International career
2004–2007	England U21	16	(1)
2010–2015	England	30	(1)

Managerial career
- 2025: Everton (interim)
Medal record
England
UEFA European U-21 Championship
Bronze medal – third place	2007 Netherlands
- * Club domestic league appearances and goals

Leighton John Baines (born 11 December 1984) is an English professional football coach and former player who played as a left-back. He is the assistant manager of Premier League club Everton.

Baines started his career with Wigan Athletic, and was part of the team that won the Second Division in the 2002–03 season and was a runner-up in the 2004–05 Championship and the 2006 League Cup final. He joined Everton in 2007, helping them reach the 2009 FA Cup final. He played for England at under-21 and senior levels. Baines was included in the England squads at UEFA Euro 2012 and the 2014 FIFA World Cup.

He retired from playing in July 2020, going on to integrate into coaching. Baines occupied a dual role at Everton, serving as the manager of their under-18 team and as a professional development coach for the club's Academy. He contributed to a brief spell as interim manager in 2025, before being promoted to the first-team coaching staff.

== Early life ==
Born in Kirkby, England, Leighton went to st Joseph the worker primary, Baines was part of the Everton youth system before departing for Wigan Athletic as a teenager.

== Club career ==
=== Wigan Athletic ===
Baines made his debut for Wigan Athletic in 2002 at the age of 17 and was a member of the team that won the Second Division in the 2002–03 season. He was a regular in the first team when Wigan earned promotion to the Premier League in 2004–05. That season saw Baines score his first goal for the club, a long-range shot against Ipswich Town.

When he secured promotion with Wigan, he doubted he was good enough to play in the Premier League: "We won promotion to the Premier League and, straight away, I was thinking, 'Where am I going to go now?' I should have been celebrating but I spent a large part of that summer worrying about what it would be like spending the next year on the bench and in the reserves."

Baines signed a new contract with Wigan in February 2005 despite being linked to a number of Premier League clubs, including Manchester United, Arsenal and Everton, and extended his contract again after impressive displays in his first season in the Premier League. Whilst at Wigan, he started in the 2006 League Cup final defeat to Manchester United.

=== Everton ===
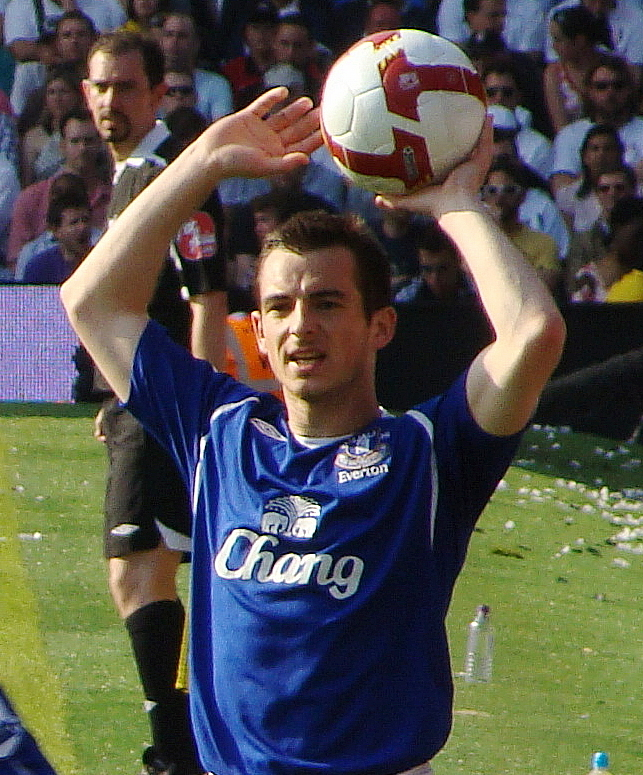
Baines playing for Everton in 2009

In July 2007, Baines rejected a move to Sunderland, after their bid of a reported £6 million was accepted by Wigan. In the following month he signed for Everton for an initial fee of £5 million, with another £1 million in add-ons, dependent on Baines's appearances for Everton.

In his first season, Baines made 29 appearances in all competitions, with his appearances limited by an injury and the good form of Phil Jagielka and Joseph Yobo at centre back which kept Joleon Lescott at left back. His second season at Everton saw an increase in Baines's playing time. Due to an injury to Yobo, Lescott moved to the centre of defence and Baines played at left back. He was voted Player of the Month at Everton two months in a row in the 2008–09 season. Baines scored his first ever Everton goal against Portsmouth on 21 March, at Fratton Park, after 57 matches (in all competitions) without scoring. On 30 August 2009, he scored a last minute penalty in a 2–1 win over his former team Wigan. A month later, he captained Everton for the first time in a UEFA Europa League match against AEK Athens.

In the 2010–11 season, Baines played every minute of Everton's Premier League matches, as well as scoring seven goals in all competitions. His contribution was rewarded with the club's Player of the Season, Players' Player of the Season, and Goal of the Season awards. His goal against Chelsea, scored from direct free kick, was voted Everton Goal of the Season. He also contributed 11 assists throughout the season, 5th overall in the league, and was the league's highest assisting defender.

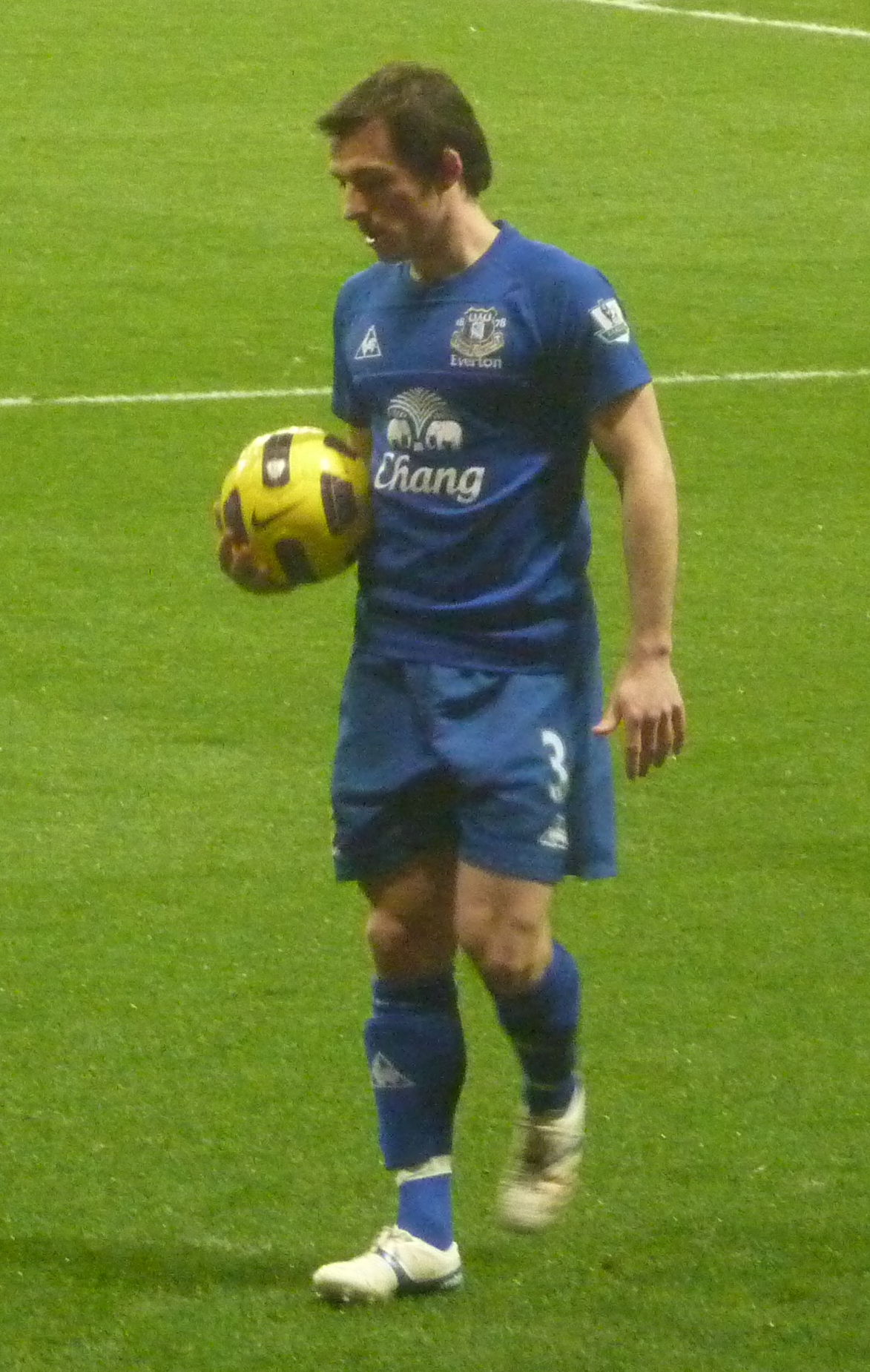
Baines playing for Everton in 2011

Baines scored five times during 2011–12, four of which were penalties. He reached 99 consecutive league matches before ending his season early due to injury. His performance at left back was deemed impressive enough to be named in the PFA's Premier League Team of the Year in 2012, the first Everton player to do so for 22 years since Neville Southall in 1989–90.

During the 2012–13 season, Baines created 116 chances for his teammates, more than any other player in Europe's top five leagues. When 2013's PFA Premier League Team of the Year was announced, Baines was again included, and he also won Everton's Player of the Season and Players' Player of the Season awards. Baines was the only outfield player to have played in every minute of every Premier League match during the season. He was the subject of multiple bids during the 2013 summer transfer window from Manchester United but all were rejected by Everton.

Baines scored two free-kicks either side of goalkeeper Jussi Jääskeläinen from the same position as Everton beat West Ham United 3–2 in September. He was only the fifth player since 2006–07 to score two direct free-kicks in one Premier League match (after Rooney, Ronaldo, Drogba and Larsson). Baines suffered a toe injury in November which saw him miss a top flight fixture for the first time in 52 matches. On 27 January 2014, Baines signed a four-year deal to extend his contract at Everton. He scored three penalties during the season to take his career tally to 13, becoming the first player in Premier League history to have taken more than 10 and never missed one. The 13th came on his 300th appearance in the competition in a 2–0 win over Manchester United. Baines scored five goals and assisted four others during 2013–14, the most of any defender in the league.

He scored his first ever goal in European football for Everton on 18 September 2014, netting from the penalty spot in a 4–1 win over Wolfsburg in the first match of their UEFA Europa League campaign. On 5 October 2014, his penalty against Manchester United was saved by David de Gea. This was the first time he missed a penalty in the Premier League. In January 2015, Baines made his 45th assist in the Premier League to overtake Graeme Le Saux as the defender with the most in the division's history. Baines missed the beginning of 2015–16 after injuring his ankle in training just before the Premier League started. Baines became the third defender to score 30 Premier League goals after John Terry (40) and David Unsworth (38) when he scored for Everton in a 3–0 win against Southampton on 2 January 2017. Baines became the first defender to reach 50 Premier League assists on 15 April 2017. Everton manager Ronald Koeman had reiterated Baines is Everton's first-choice penalty taker after he equalled the club's spot-kick record.

Baines scored the winner for Everton in the UEFA Europa League third qualifying round first leg against Slovak side Ružomberok on 27 July 2017. By scoring a penalty in a 3–2 home win over Watford on 5 November 2017, Baines became Everton's leading Premier League penalty scorer.

He was offered a new one-year contract by Everton at the end of the 2018–19 season. On his first start of the 2019–20 season, on 18 December 2019, Baines scored the equalizer from 25 yards against Leicester City in the 91st minute of an EFL Cup tie. The match ended in a 2–2 draw before Everton eventually lost on penalties, with Baines having his spot kick saved. At the conclusion of the season Baines announced his retirement from professional football.

== International career ==
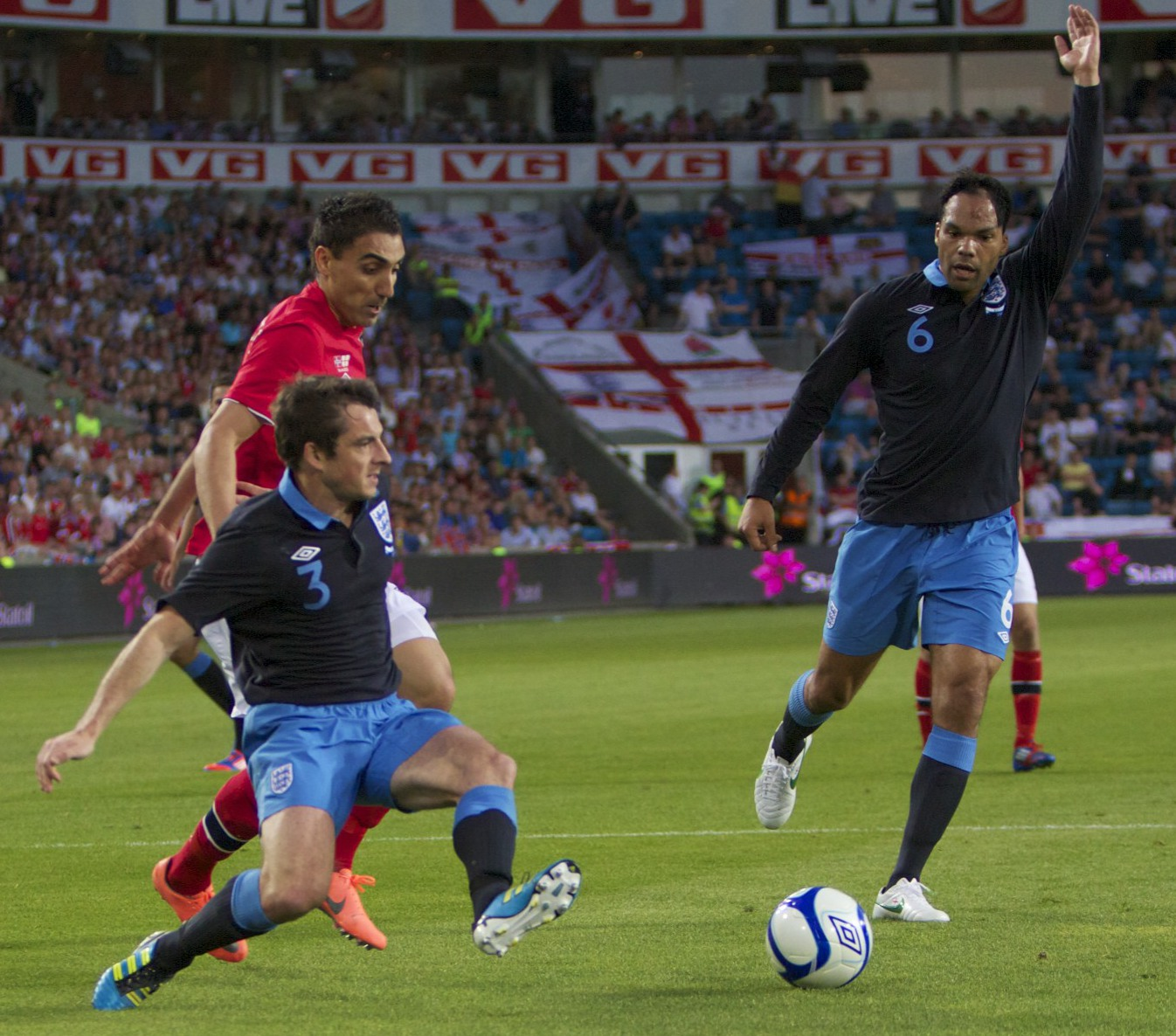
Baines (left, in navy blue) playing for England in 2012

Baines made his debut for the England under-21s in a 2006 UEFA European Under-21 Championship qualification away to Austria in September 2004 under Peter Taylor.

In the following campaign Baines scored a vital goal for the England under-21 team against Germany on 6 October 2006, securing a 1–0 win in the first leg of a UEFA European U21 Championship play-off. He played all four of England's matches in the 2007 UEFA European Under-21 Championship finals. In total he played 16 times for the under-21 team and scored one goal.

Baines was called up to the senior England squad for the first time in March 2009, and made his full international debut in a friendly against Egypt at Wembley Stadium on 3 March 2010, playing the full 90 minutes of a 3–1 win for England. He was selected in a provisional squad of 30 players for the 2010 FIFA World Cup, but did not make the final squad of 23 players to be taken to South Africa, with Aston Villa left back Stephen Warnock, who had not played in the warm-up matches, taken in his place. Baines made his competitive international debut on 4 June 2011, replacing the injured Ashley Cole in a Euro 2012 qualifier against Switzerland, assisting Ashley Young for England's equalising goal.

Baines was named in Roy Hodgson's squad for Euro 2012 in May, but did not feature in the tournament with Hodgson using Ashley Cole for all four of England's matches.

In September 2012, he scored his first international goal against Moldova in a 2014 FIFA World Cup qualification match, a deflected free kick which was the last of England's goals in a 5–0 win.

On 30 May 2014, Baines' corners in a Wembley friendly against Peru led to two of England's goals in a 3–0 win.

He played full back in England's first two matches in the 2014 FIFA World Cup (against Italy and Uruguay); both ended in 1–2 defeats as the team was eliminated in the first round of the World Cup for the first time since 1958.

== Style of play ==
Baines is described in his UEFA.com profile as a "dependable left back" who is "best known for his set-piece expertise and penalties". But in his early years, Baines played in midfield and attack; it was only when he started at Wigan that he began to play in the left back position. In 2014, Roberto Martínez considered redeploying Baines as a midfielder, in a similar change to Philipp Lahm. Baines stated that he would be "excited to give it a go".

Baines also held the record for the most assists as a defender in the Premier League. Baines has also drawn praise in the media for his crossing, stamina, link up play, and ability to avoid injuries.

== Coaching career ==
Former Tottenham Hotspur and Leeds United goalkeeper Paul Robinson stated that he believed that Baines would enter into a career in management after retirement from playing, predicting that he would one day take over as the manager of Everton in the future. Furthermore, after Baines officially announced his retirement from playing, Danny Mills tipped him to go into coaching at Everton.

In September 2020, just two months after retiring from playing, Baines was appointed as professional development coach at Everton's academy set-up. That December, David Unsworth, the manager of the club's under-23s, expressed that he was impressed with Baines' contribution to the team's coaching staff, believing his presence to have a huge impact on the young players coming through the youth system. In October 2021, Baines was appointed assistant manager of Everton U18 team, and then, in July 2022, Everton U18 manager.

After the former manager Sean Dyche left the club in early January 2025, he became Everton's men's first team interim manager alongside Séamus Coleman. Everton recorded a 2–0 win over Peterborough under the duo's management, and advanced into the 4th round of the FA Cup.

== Personal life ==
Baines was born and raised in Kirkby, Merseyside and was educated at St Joseph The Worker Catholic Primary School and All Saints' RC High School in Kirkby. He began playing football at a local Liverpool primary school but, age 10, had trouble playing for a Sunday League team because he was shy. He has three children with his wife, Rachel. Baines is a close friend of musician Miles Kane, and is himself a keen guitarist.

== Career statistics ==
=== Club ===
Appearances and goals by club, season and competition
Club	Season	League			FA Cup		League Cup		Other		Total	
Club	Season	Division	Apps	Goals	Apps	Goals	Apps	Goals	Apps	Goals	Apps	Goals
Wigan Athletic	2001–02	Second Division	0	0	0	0	0	0	0	0	0	0
Wigan Athletic	2002–03	Second Division	6	0	2	0	2	0	2 (Note: Appearances in Football League Trophy)	0	12	0
Wigan Athletic	2003–04	First Division	26	0	1	0	1	0	—		28	0
Wigan Athletic	2004–05	Championship	41	1	0	0	1	0	—		42	1
Wigan Athletic	2005–06	Premier League	37	0	2	0	4	0	—		43	0
Wigan Athletic	2006–07	Premier League	35	3	1	0	1	0	—		37	3
Wigan Athletic	Total		145	4	6	0	9	0	2	0	162	4
Everton	2007–08	Premier League	22	0	1	0	1	0	5 (Note: Appearance(s) in UEFA Cup)	0	29	0
Everton	2008–09	Premier League	31	1	7	0	0	0	1	0	39	1
Everton	2009–10	Premier League	37	1	2	1	1	0	8 (Note: Appearances in UEFA Europa League)	0	48	2
Everton	2010–11	Premier League	38	5	4	2	2	0	—		44	7
Everton	2011–12	Premier League	33	4	6	1	3	0	—		42	5
Everton	2012–13	Premier League	38	5	5	2	1	0	—		44	7
Everton	2013–14	Premier League	32	5	3	1	0	0	—		35	6
Everton	2014–15	Premier League	31	2	1	0	0	0	5	1	37	3
Everton	2015–16	Premier League	18	2	2	0	3	0	—		23	2
Everton	2016–17	Premier League	32	2	1	0	0	0	—		33	2
Everton	2017–18	Premier League	22	2	0	0	1	0	6	1	29	3
Everton	2018–19	Premier League	6	0	1	0	1	0	—		8	0
Everton	2019–20	Premier League	8	0	0	0	1	1	—		9	1
Everton	Total		348	29	33	7	14	1	25	2	420	39
Career total			493	33	39	7	23	1	27	2	582	43

=== International ===
Appearances and goals by national team and year
National team	Year	Apps	Goals
England	2010	2	0
England	2011	4	0
England	2012	7	1
England	2013	9	0
England	2014	7	0
England	2015	1	0
Total		30	1

Scores and results list England's goal tally first, score column indicates score after each Baines goal.

List of international goals scored by Leighton Baines
No.	Date	Venue	Cap	Opponent	Score	Result	Competition	Ref.
1	7 September 2012	Zimbru Stadium, Chișinău, Moldova	10	Moldova	5–0	5–0	2014 FIFA World Cup qualification	

== Managerial statistics ==
As of match played 9 January 2025

Managerial record by team and tenure
Team	From	To	Record							
Team	From	To	G	W	D	L	GF	GA	GD	Win %
Everton (joint interim manager)	9 January 2025	11 January 2025	1	1	0	0	2	0	+2	100.00
Total			1	1	0	0	2	0	+2	100.00

== Honours ==
Wigan Athletic

- Football League Championship runner-up: 2004–05
- Football League Cup runner-up: 2005–06

Everton

- FA Cup runner-up: 2008–09

Individual

- PFA Team of the Year: 2011–12 Premier League, 2012–13 Premier League
- Wigan Athletic Player of the Season: 2006–07
- Everton Player of the Season: 2010–11, 2012–13
- Everton Players' Player of the Season: 2009–10, 2010–11, 2012–13
- Everton Goal of the Season: 2010–11
- Sports Illustrated Premier League Team of the Decade: 2010–2019
- Everton Giant: 2026
