= Dan Gosling =

English association football player

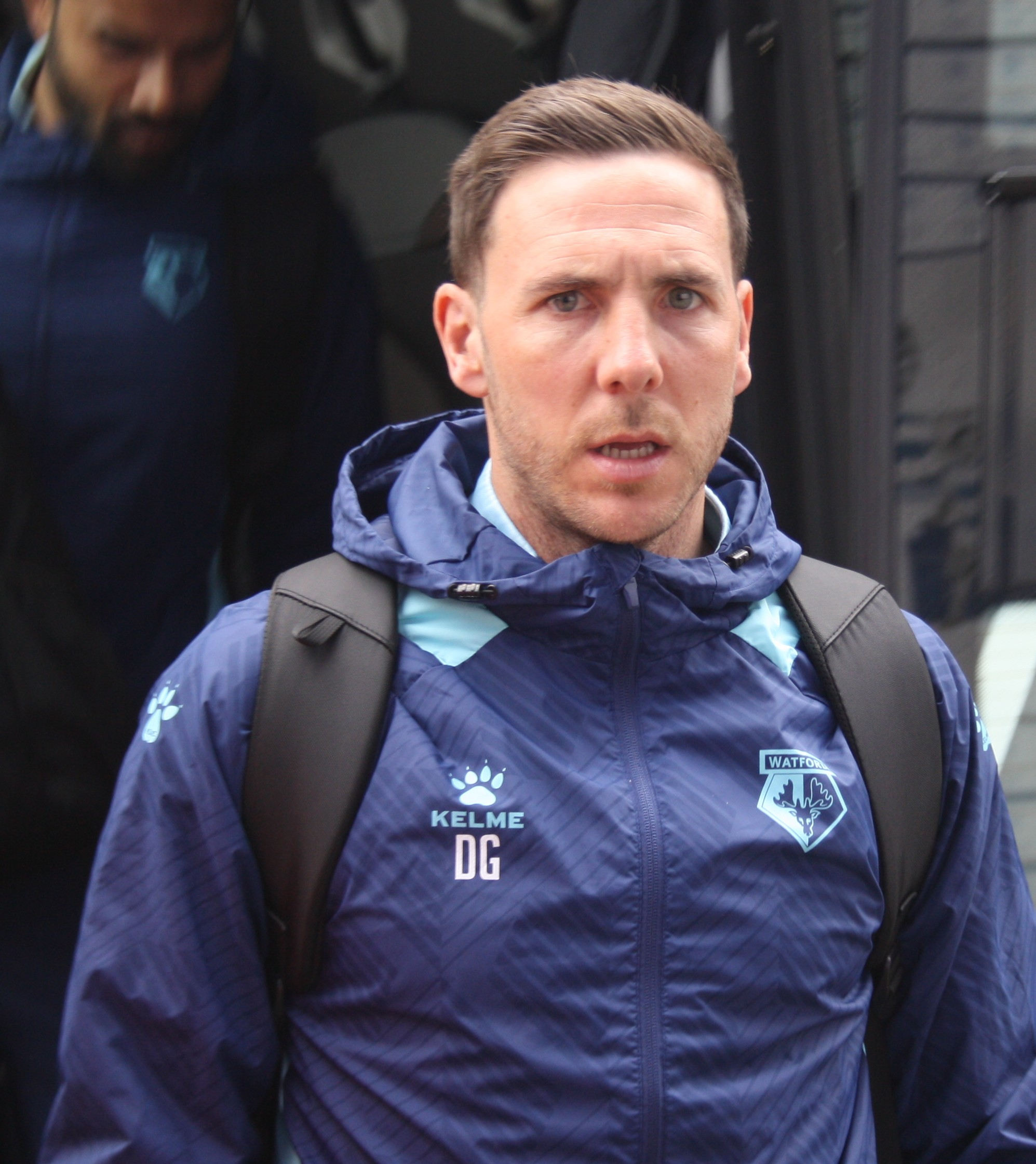
- Gosling in 2026

Personal information
- Full name: Daniel Gosling
- Date of birth: 1 February 1990 (age 36)
- Place of birth: Brixham, England
- Height: 6 ft 0 in (1.83 m)
- Position: Midfielder

Team information
- Current team: Westfield; Watford (Under-18s head coach)

Youth career
- –2003: Brixham United
- 2003–2006: Plymouth Argyle

Senior career*
Years	Team	Apps	(Gls)
2006–2008	Plymouth Argyle	22	(2)
2008–2010	Everton	22	(4)
2010–2014	Newcastle United	24	(1)
2013–2014	→ Blackpool (loan)	14	(2)
2014–2021	AFC Bournemouth	171	(14)
2021–2023	Watford	34	(3)
2023–2024	Notts County	6	(0)
2024–	Westfield	0	(0)

International career
2007	England U17	5	(0)
2007–2008	England U18	2	(0)
2008–2009	England U19	8	(1)
2009–2011	England U21	3	(0)
- * Club domestic league appearances and goals as of 15:04, 23 May 2024 (UTC)

Daniel Gosling (born 1 February 1990) is an English professional football coach and player who plays as a midfielder for Mid-Sussex League club Westfield. He is currently head coach of Watford's Under-18s.

Gosling is a versatile player, having been deployed as a box-to-box midfielder on several occasions and occasionally deputised at right-back to accommodate substitutions. He previously played for Plymouth Argyle, Everton, Newcastle United, Notts County, AFC Bournemouth, and Watford.

== Club career ==
=== Plymouth Argyle ===
Born in Brixham, Devon, Gosling was spotted by Plymouth Argyle scouts when he was playing in the under-12 side of hometown club Brixham United. On 9 December 2006, at age 16 years and 310 days, he made his professional debut against Hull City, coming on as a first-half substitute for injured Captain Paul Wotton and became the fourth youngest debutant. His full debut came on New Year's Day 2007, against Southampton at Home Park. He proved his versatility in a solid performance, by moving from right-midfield to right-back after an early injury to defender Mathias Kouo-Doumbé.

Gosling established himself as a regular in the reserve team, and his impressive performances were noticed by manager Ian Holloway. At the beginning of March 2007 he trained for a week with Premiership club Chelsea along with teammates Luke Summerfield and Scott Sinclair. That same year he was named The Herald's Young Sports Personality of the Year in 2007.

=== Everton ===
In January 2008, Gosling signed a two-and-a-half-year contract for Premier League team Everton from Plymouth, days after Everton's Lukas Jutkiewicz was loaned to the Pilgrims. His first-team debut came in a 1–0 away victory against Middlesbrough in December 2008, and his first goal for the club came two days later in a 3–0 victory over Sunderland at Goodison Park. After the match, he was given a standing ovation by his own teammates in the dressing room.

In February 2009, Gosling came on as a substitute and scored the only goal in the FA Cup fourth round replay at Goodison Park against crosstown rivals Liverpool in the 118th minute. An error by live broadcasters ITV during the match meant the goal was missed by millions of TV viewers, including Gosling's mother Hilary. The goal scored against Liverpool was voted Everton's 'Goal of the Season' by the fans of the club. He went on to play in the 2009 FA Cup Final, coming on as a second-half substitute.

In the 2009–10 season, Gosling was mostly on the bench for league games, but was in the starting eleven for most of the League Cup and Europa League matches. In March 2010, he ruptured his anterior cruciate ligament after a collision with Wolverhampton Wanderers goalkeeper Marcus Hahnemann, and was ruled out of playing for nine months.

==== Contract negotiations and exit ====
Negotiations for a contract extension began in May 2009. Gosling declared "there's no other club I'd rather be at", however no extension was agreed and his contract with Everton expired on 30 June 2010. During contract negotiations Gosling was represented by David Hodgson, a solicitor and former professional footballer.

On 6 July 2010, the Daily Mirror reported that the PFCC tribunal's decision allowed Gosling to leave Everton under the Bosman ruling with no compensation being paid by the club who sign the player. Everton were required to submit a contract with better terms than the existing contract to Gosling before the 30 May deadline to enable the club to receive compensation from any English club interested in signing Gosling. The compensation amount has been reported as being as high as £4million.

The PFCC tribunal based their decision on Everton's contract offer being verbally arranged and not in writing: had the contract been in writing the Merseyside club would have been entitled to compensation should Gosling have moved to another English club (but not to a non-English club) as he is under 24 years of age. The tribunal's decision also meant that Gosling's previous club Plymouth Argyle would receive no monetary amount despite a sell-on clause in Gosling's Everton contract. As the playing contract expired Everton and Plymouth are also no longer entitled to solidarity contributions despite the player being registered with the clubs before he turned 23. During the season Plymouth went into administration.

=== Newcastle United ===
On 22 July 2010, Gosling signed for Newcastle United He made only one appearance in his first season for the club, because of a continuing problem with his knee, resulting in surgery in February 2011. From then on, he only made substitute appearances due to the prominent pairing of Cheick Tioté and Yohan Cabaye. Following Cabaye's departure in January 2014, he began to be used more regularly until the end of the season. His only goal for the club came in a 3–1 defeat to Manchester City on 19 November 2011, which ended the Magpies' unbeaten start to the 2011–12 season.

On 4 October 2013, Gosling signed a three-month loan deal with Blackpool. He returned in January 2014, having made 14 appearances.

=== AFC Bournemouth ===
On 16 May 2014, Gosling agreed a four-year contract with Championship club AFC Bournemouth. Due to the prominent midfield partnership of Harry Arter and Andrew Surman, Gosling struggled to cement his position in the starting XI in the league. Gosling commented that "On my first day here, I saw the quality and it took me by surprise a little. I didn't play a lot because the team was performing so well and it was the same for Adam Smith and Junior Stanislas. I made one start in the Championship season which, out of 46 games, was quite incredible really". Gosling did however go on an impressive scoring run in the League Cup, scoring 5 goals in 5 appearances. Gosling finished his debut season with the club having made 24 total appearances, as the Cherries were promoted to the Premier League for the first time in their history.

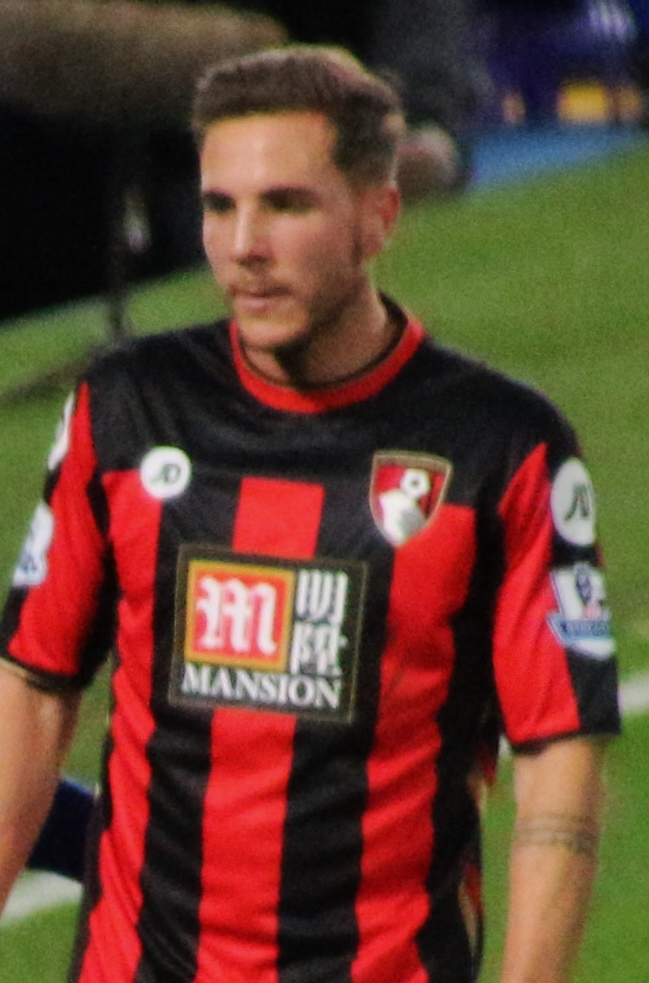
Gosling playing for AFC Bournemouth in 2015

==== Premier league years ====
Gosling played a much more significant role in the Cherries' maiden Premier League season, making 37 appearances across all competitions. He scored his first league goal for the club in a 2–1 away loss to Stoke City, on 26 August. He scored his second goal of the season in a 2–2 away draw versus Swansea City, helping Bournemouth to end a run of four successive defeats. Gosling scored his third and final Premier League goal of the season in an impressive 3–0 home win over fellow promoted side Norwich City. Bournemouth ended up finishing in 16th in the league, avoiding relegation and capping off a successful second season for Gosling at the club. In July 2019 he had hip surgery, ruling him out for three months.

=== Watford ===
After six and a half years at Bournemouth, Gosling signed a two-and-a-half-year deal with Watford on 31 January 2021, for an undisclosed fee. He scored his first goal for Watford in a 4–1 win against Rotherham United on 16 March 2021.

=== Notts County ===
On 6 November 2023, Gosling joined League Two club Notts County on a short-term deal until 6 January 2024. He departed the club at the end of his contract.

=== Westfield ===
On 13 June 2024, Gosling joined Mid Sussex Football League Premier Division side Westfield, owned by former Bournemouth teammate Steve Cook.

== International career ==
Gosling earned himself a call-up to the England Under-17s squad for the UEFA European U17 Championship Qualifying Round in Bosnia at the end of March 2007 after displaying good form for the Pilgrims, and was also included in the England U17 squad for the 2007 European Championships in Belgium. England finished twenty-third in that tournament, qualifying for the 2007 FIFA U-17 World Cup, with Gosling also making the tournament squad. He was promoted to the under-19 squad for the 2008 European Championships.

In the summer of 2009, Gosling was called up for the final squad to participate in the U19 European Championship and started in every game. He scored a goal against Ukraine in the group stage match to give England the lead but Ukraine equalised to draw 2–2. England ended the tournament as runners-up to Ukraine.

Gosling was called up to the England U21 squad for the first time as a replacement for injured clubmate Jack Rodwell. He was named as a substitute in Stuart Pearce's 18-man squad for the double qualifier against Portugal on 14 November and Lithuania three days later. He made his debut in the match when he came on as an extra time substitute for Fabian Delph against Portugal.

== Coaching career ==
On 23 May 2024, Gosling returned to former club Watford as Under-21 Assistant Coach, working alongside under-21 manager Charlie Daniels, his former teammate from Bournemouth. In August 2025, he became lead coach of the Under-18s, replacing Matt Bevans.

== Personal life ==
Gosling is married and has three children.

Gosling was charged with misconduct under Rule E8(b) of the FA's regulations, which relates to players betting on football matches, and on 10 March 2014, Gosling admitted "multiple breaches", requesting a personal hearing to answer his case.

== Career statistics ==
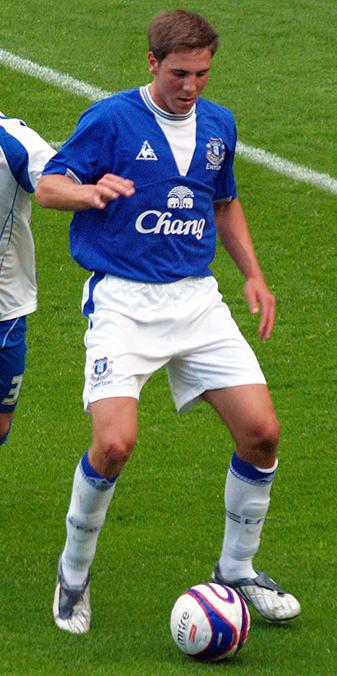
Gosling playing for Everton in 2009

As of 23 May 2024

Appearances and goals by club, season and competition
Club	Season	League			FA Cup		League Cup		Europe		Other		Total	
Club	Season	Division	Apps	Goals	Apps	Goals	Apps	Goals	Apps	Goals	Apps	Goals	Apps	Goals
Plymouth Argyle	2006–07	Championship	12	2	2	0	0	0	—		—		14	2
Plymouth Argyle	2007–08	Championship	10	0	0	0	0	0	—		—		10	0
Plymouth Argyle	Total		22	2	2	0	0	0	0	0	0	0	24	2
Everton	2007–08	Premier League	0	0	0	0	0	0	0	0	—		0	0
Everton	2008–09	Premier League	11	2	6	1	0	0	0	0	—		17	3
Everton	2009–10	Premier League	11	2	0	0	2	1	7	0	—		20	3
Everton	Total		22	4	6	1	2	1	7	0	0	0	37	6
Newcastle United	2010–11	Premier League	1	0	0	0	0	0	—		—		1	0
Newcastle United	2011–12	Premier League	12	1	2	0	2	0	—		—		16	1
Newcastle United	2012–13	Premier League	3	0	0	0	1	0	5	0	—		9	0
Newcastle United	2013–14	Premier League	8	0	0	0	2	0	0	0	—		10	0
Newcastle United	Total		24	1	2	0	5	0	5	0	0	0	36	1
Blackpool (loan)	2013–14	Championship	14	2	0	0	0	0	—		—		14	2
AFC Bournemouth	2014–15	Championship	18	0	1	0	5	5	—		—		24	5
AFC Bournemouth	2015–16	Premier League	34	3	1	0	3	1	—		—		38	4
AFC Bournemouth	2016–17	Premier League	27	2	1	0	3	1	—		—		31	3
AFC Bournemouth	2017–18	Premier League	28	2	0	0	3	1	—		—		31	3
AFC Bournemouth	2018–19	Premier League	25	2	0	0	1	0	—		—		26	2
AFC Bournemouth	2019–20	Premier League	24	3	0	0	1	0	—		—		25	3
AFC Bournemouth	2020–21	Championship	15	2	1	0	2	0	—		—		18	2
AFC Bournemouth	Total		171	14	4	0	18	7	0	0	0	0	193	21
Watford	2020–21	Championship	13	2	0	0	0	0	—		—		13	2
Watford	2021–22	Premier League	4	1	1	0	1	0	—		—		6	1
Watford	2022–23	Championship	17	0	0	0	1	0	—		—		18	0
Watford	Total		34	3	1	0	2	0	0	0	0	0	36	3
Notts County	2023–24	League Two	6	0	1	0	0	0	—		1	0	8	0
Career total			293	26	16	1	26	8	12	0	1	0	348	35

== Honours ==
Everton

- FA Cup runner-up: 2008–09

Bournemouth

- Football League Championship: 2014–15

England U19

- UEFA European Under-19 Championship runner-up: 2009

Individual

- Everton Goal of the Season: 2008–09
