= 2013–14 Everton F.C. season =

English football club season

Everton
2013–14 season
- Chairman: Bill Kenwright
- Manager: Roberto Martínez
- Stadium: Goodison Park (39,571)
- Premier League: 5th
- FA Cup: Sixth Round
- League Cup: Third Round
- Top goalscorer: League: Romelu Lukaku (15); All: Romelu Lukaku (16)
- Average home league attendance: 37,732
Home colours	Away colours	Third colours

The 2013–14 season was Everton's 22nd season in the Premier League and 60th consecutive season in the top division of English football. It was also Everton's 115th season of league football and 117th season in all competitions. It was the first season without David Moyes as manager since 2002, with Moyes leaving Everton to succeed Alex Ferguson as manager of Manchester United. In addition, the club crest was redesigned ahead of this season for the first time since 2000. On 5 June 2013, Roberto Martínez was announced as the new Everton manager, having left his post at relegated FA Cup holders Wigan Athletic. Everton finished in sixth position in the domestic league in the previous season, missing out on qualification for the UEFA Europa League, meaning it failed to qualify for any European competitions for the fourth season running.

Everton's Premier League campaign began in August 2013 with Martínez changing their style of play to a possession based, attractive brand of football which initially led to three successive draws to start the season. A first victory came in the next match 1–0 against Chelsea and by Christmas Everton had only suffered one defeat, a run which included a win over Moyes' Manchester United, the first time the club had tasted success at Old Trafford in 21 years. The team almost went an entire year unbeaten at home but lost 1–0 against Sunderland on Boxing Day. Everton's progress stalled somewhat in the early part of 2014 with three losses in four games against Liverpool, Tottenham Hotspur and Chelsea, before winning seven league games in a row for the first time since 1987. The spell contained perhaps Everton's best performance of the season when they defeated Arsenal 3–0. The streak was ended with a 3–2 home defeat by Crystal Palace, but Everton returned to do the double over Manchester United for the first time since 1969. Moyes was sacked as their manager a day later. Two defeats in a row after this ended Everton's Champions League hopes but a finish of 5th in the league table is their highest in five years with Everton qualifying for next season's Europa League. Martínez utilised the loan market during the season, with Romelu Lukaku (on loan from Chelsea) being Everton's top scorer with 16 goals in all competitions. The emergence of young players such as Ross Barkley, John Stones and summer signing James McCarthy was also a feature of his debut season in charge, with Barkley going on to be selected for England's World Cup squad. Right back Séamus Coleman was named Everton's player of the year.

In the cup competitions Everton lost in the sixth round of the FA Cup (entered at round three) and the third round of the League Cup (entered at round two).

== Season overview ==
=== July ===
Everton announced on 25 May 2013 that the club would be competing in the inaugural edition of the International Champions Cup, based in venues across the United States and in one European city, and held between 27 July and 7 August 2013. The opening fixtures were announced four days later, with Everton playing 2012–13 Serie A champions Juventus in the first round.

Between 8 and 9 July 2013, Roberto Martínez signed four players who last season played for his former club Wigan Athletic:

- Arouna Koné, a 29-year-old Ivorian striker who scored 11 goals in his debut Premier League campaign in the previous season. Everton met a £5 million release clause and beat off the competition of Newcastle United to sign him.
- Antolín Alcaraz, a 30-year-old Paraguayan central defender who joined on a free transfer after his contract at Wigan had expired. He had been at Wigan for three seasons but saw his 2012–13 season curtailed due to a groin injury.
- Joel Robles, a 23-year-old Spanish goalkeeper who had spent last year on loan to Wigan from Atlético Madrid. He joined on a five-year contract for an undisclosed fee.
- James McCarthy, signed from Wigan for £13 million. He became the club's second most expensive player in their history; due to a clause in his Wigan contract, his former club Hamilton received a sell-on fee from the Everton transfer, which they used to invest in the youth system through which the player had emerged. He forged a partnership with Gareth Barry which was a key factor in Everton amassing 72 points during the campaign, a club record in the Premier League. Martínez claimed that McCarthy's performances had been so impressive that his transfer value had doubled during his first season. McCarthy had to wait until the last game of the season to score his first goal for the club when he netted the opener in a 2–0 win over Hull City.

Everton also signed 19-year-old Spanish forward Gerard Deulofeu on a season-long loan from Barcelona the following day, on 10 July 2013.

=== August ===
Everton's Premier League campaign began on 17 August with a 2–2 draw away to Norwich City, during which Ross Barkley scored his first goal for the club. New manager Roberto Martínez saw his first competitive win come in the second round of the League Cup with Everton needing extra time to defeat League One Stevenage 2–1.

=== September ===
On the final day of the summer transfer window Everton brought three players into the club:

- James McCarthy, a 22-year-old central midfielder who had previously been at Wigan for four years. Everton paid £13 million for the player.
- Romelu Lukaku on a season-long loan from Chelsea. He had been on loan at West Bromwich Albion last season, scoring 17 goals in 35 league games.
- Gareth Barry, a 32-year-old defensive midfielder also on a season-long loan from Manchester City. He had made 53 appearances for England.

Two long standing Everton players were sold:

- Marouane Fellaini left for Manchester United in a £27.5 million deal.
- Victor Anichebe was transferred to West Bromwich Albion in a deal which could rise to £6 million. The striker had made 168 appearances for the club, scoring 26 goals.

Everton's first league win of the season came with a 1–0 home success over Chelsea with Steven Naismith getting the game's only goal. They then came back from 2–1 down to beat West Ham United 3–2 at Upton Park as Leighton Baines scored two free-kicks and Romelu Lukaku became the first Everton player since Alan Ball in 1966 to score a winner on their debut. The result also made Roberto Martínez the first ever manager in the club's history to be unbeaten in their first six games. However, the run did not last as in the next fixture Fulham won 2–1 in the third round of the League Cup. New striker Lukaku continued his early form for the club by scoring two goals in the next league game against Newcastle United in a match where Everton led 3–0 at half-time and survived a second half comeback to win 3–2.

=== October ===
Everton's unbeaten run in the Premier League at the start of the season came to an end on 5 October when it was defeated by Manchester City by 3–1 at the City of Manchester Stadium. After the international break the following week, Everton returned to winning ways with a 2–1 home victory over Hull City, which saw Steven Pienaar score the winning goal just 10 seconds after coming off the bench, making his return to the side from a hamstring injury. A 2–0 away win over Aston Villa the following week saw Romelu Lukaku score his fifth goal in as many league appearances for Everton, and momentarily moved the club into fourth position on the league table.

=== November ===
Everton began the month with a 0–0 home draw against Tottenham Hotspur which meant the club had only suffered one defeat from their opening 10 games in successive seasons for the first time in its history. Another 0–0 draw followed before the first Merseyside derby of the season during which Everton came from 2–1 down to lead 3–2, before an 89th minute Liverpool goal saw the game end 3–3. Everton returned to winning ways by defeating Stoke City 4–0 with both Gerard Deulofeu and Bryan Oviedo scoring their first league goals for the club. Romelu Lukaku continued his impressive start to the season by scoring his eighth goal in ten games as Everton finished the month in the Champions League places.

=== December ===
The next fixture saw Manchester United manager David Moyes face his former club for the first time and it was Everton who won 1–0 to record their first victory at Old Trafford for the first time in 21 years with another goal from Oviedo. Deulofeu scored an 84th-minute goal to earn a 1–1 draw with league leaders Arsenal at the Emirates Stadium in the next fixture. Everton then beat Fulham at home for the 21st consecutive time with a 4–1 win as Leon Osman scored on his 300th league appearance for the club. Everton then travelled to Swansea and won 2–1, maintaining their record of never having lost to the Welsh side in any fixture. The club then suffered a setback to bottom of the table Sunderland, losing at home in the league for the first time in a year, after Tim Howard conceded an early penalty and was sent off in the 25th minute. Winning ways were restored in the following fixture against Southampton with goals from Coleman and Lukaku, his first in five league starts, to ensure Everton ended 2013 fourth in the table.

=== January ===
The new year began with Everton travelling to the Britannia Stadium to face Stoke City and they earned a 1–1 draw courtesy of a stoppage time Leighton Baines penalty. A comfortable progression into the fourth round of the FA Cup followed by beating Championship side Queens Park Rangers 4–0 with striker Nikica Jelavić scoring his first goals of the season. Everton's first league win of 2014 was a 2–0 home success over Norwich City, meaning the side had now earned 42 points from their last 51 at Goodison Park. The club then saw off League One side Stevenage 4–0 to reach the fifth round of the FA Cup, but then suffered their biggest derby defeat since 1982 as Liverpool thrashed them 4–0 at Anfield.

During the January transfer window Everton brought two players into their first team squad:

- Aiden McGeady, an Irish international winger from Russian side Spartak Moscow for an undisclosed fee.
- Lacina Traoré, a six-foot eight Ivorian centre forward on loan for the rest of the season from Monaco.

The club also sold two players during the month:

- Nikica Jelavić's two-year stay at the club ended after he moved to Hull City. The striker had enjoyed a fast start for Everton by scoring nine goals in his first thirteen games, but netted just two goals in the whole of 2013. He had fallen behind Romelu Lukaku as the first choice striker and also moved in a bid to improve his chances of selection in Croatia's squad for the World Cup.
- John Heitinga moved to Fulham after four and a half years at Everton. He had struggled for first team football during the season having failed to start a single league game, but did score on his final appearance for the club in an FA Cup fixture against Stevenage.

=== February ===
Kevin Mirallas scored a fantastic 25 yard freekick as Everton came from a goal down to beat Aston Villa 2–1. Everton lost for the second time in three games as Tottenham Hotspur defeated them 1–0 at White Hart Lane, but their form in the FA Cup continued with a 3–1 home success over Swansea City to reach the quarter-finals. The club then lost a second league game in a row for the first time this season when Chelsea scored a stoppage time winner at Stamford Bridge.

=== March ===
Romelu Lukaku returned from an ankle injury to score a late goal in a 1–0 win over West Ham United to begin March, but Everton were knocked out of the FA Cup following a 4–1 defeat to Arsenal which means the club have now failed to beat the Gunners in the last 20 away meetings. Séamus Coleman's miscued shot in the last minute of the next game against Cardiff City ensured Everton responded with a 2–1 victory to be placed sixth in the table. The club then won four league games in a row for the first time in six years by defeating Newcastle United 3–0 thanks to an amazing solo goal from Ross Barkley who dribbled from inside his own half to score the opener. It was Everton's biggest win at Newcastle in 47 years. Everton ended the month with a fifth successive victory for the first time since 2002 with a 3–1 away win over Fulham.

=== April and May ===
Everton beat Champions League rivals Arsenal 3–0 at home in a performance manager Martínez described as tactically perfect. The result left the side a point behind the fourth placed Gunners with a game in hand. A seventh successive league win for the first time since 1987 followed with a 1–0 victory over Sunderland which moved the club into fourth place. It also took them to 65 points, the highest total Everton have ever amassed in a Premier League season. The club then handed the initiative back to Arsenal in the race for Champions League football as they lost 3–2 at home to Crystal Palace. Everton responded with a 2–0 victory over Manchester United and in doing so did the double over for the reigning champions for the first time since 1969. Everton's previous manager David Moyes was sacked by United a day later after just 10 months in charge. However, Everton then lost 2–0 against Southampton (with own goals from Antolín Alcaraz and Séamus Coleman) and 3–2 to Manchester City to end their chances of finishing the campaign in fourth place. Before the Manchester City game there had been rumours that Everton would not try 100% or field a weakened side as any positive result would give rivals Liverpool the impetus in the race for the title. Roberto Martínez insisted his team would be giving everything they had for the win and, despite the loss, he said afterwards that he was proud of the effort of the players. Everton finished the season by winning 2–0 away at FA Cup finalists Hull City to finish fifth in the table and qualify for next season's Europa League.

== Pre-season ==
=== Friendlies ===
14 July	Austria Vienna	2 – 1	(England) Everton	Vienna, Austria
17:00 CEST	Stanković 14', 38' (pen.)	Report	Vellios 39'	Stadium: Franz Horr Stadium; Attendance: 7,125; Referee: Gerhard Grobelnik (Austria)

17 July	Accrington Stanley (England)	1 – 4	(England) Everton	Accrington, England
19:45 BST	Murphy 44'	Report	Gibson 11'; Anichebe 16'; Mirallas 42'; Osman 62'	Stadium: Crown Ground; Attendance: 3,642; Referee: Neil Swarbrick (England)

27 July	Blackburn Rovers (England)	1 – 3	(England) Everton	Blackburn, England
14:00 BST	Dann 87'	Report	Mirallas 24'; Jelavić 55', 78'	Stadium: Ewood Park; Attendance: 9,142; Referee: Graham Salisbury (England)

11 August	Everton (England)	2 – 1	(Spain) Real Betis	Liverpool, England
15:00 BST	Jelavić 35'; Mirallas 62'	Report	Braian 90'	Stadium: Goodison Park; Referee: Howard Webb (England)

=== International Champions Cup ===
31 July First round	Juventus (Italy)	1 – 1 (5 – 6 p)	(England) Everton	San Francisco, United States
20:00 PDT	Asamoah 81'	Report	Mirallas 61'	Stadium: AT&T Park; Attendance: 22,208
	Penalties
	Matri (penalty scored); Asamoah (penalty scored); Vučinić (penalty scored); Vidal (penalty scored); Pirlo (penalty missed); Motta (penalty scored); Peluso (penalty missed)		(penalty missed) Osman; (penalty scored) Barkley; (penalty scored) Mirallas; (penalty scored) Jagielka; (penalty scored) Oviedo; (penalty scored) Stones; (penalty scored) Coleman

3 August Second round	Everton (England)	1 – 2	(Spain) Real Madrid	Los Angeles, United States
19:30 PDT	Jelavić 60'	Report	Ronaldo 17'; Özil 31'	Stadium: Dodger Stadium; Attendance: 40,681

6 August Championship round	Everton (England)	0 – 1	(Spain) Valencia	Miami Gardens, United States
21:00 EDT		Report	Míchel 53'	Stadium: Sun Life Stadium; Attendance: 38,513

== Competitions ==
=== Overall ===
Competition	Started round	Current position / round	Final position / round	First match	Last match
Premier League	—	—	5th	17 August 2013	11 May 2014
League Cup	2nd round	—	3rd round	28 August 2013	24 September 2013
FA Cup	3rd round	—	6th round	4 January 2014	8 March 2014

Updated to match played 16 April 2014
Source: Competitions

=== Premier League ===
==== League table ====
Pos	Team	Pld	W	D	L	GF	GA	GD	Pts	Qualification or relegation
3	Chelsea	38	25	7	6	71	27	+44	82	Qualification for the Champions League group stage
4	Arsenal	38	24	7	7	68	41	+27	79	Qualification for the Champions League play-off round
5	Everton	38	21	9	8	61	39	+22	72	Qualification for the Europa League group stage
6	Tottenham Hotspur	38	21	6	11	55	51	+4	69	Qualification for the Europa League play-off round (Note: Since the winners of 2013–14 Football League Cup (Manchester City) qualified for the Champions League, the spot awarded to them (Europa League play-off round) was passed to the 6th-placed team.)
7	Manchester United	38	19	7	12	64	43	+21	64	

Source: Barclays Premier League
Rules for classification: 1) Points; 2) Goal difference; 3) Goals scored; 4) Play-offs (only if needed to decide champion, teams for relegation or teams for UEFA competitions).

==== Results summary ====
Overall								Home						Away					
Pld	W	D	L	GF	GA	GD	Pts	W	D	L	GF	GA	GD	W	D	L	GF	GA	GD
38	21	9	8	61	39	+22	72	13	3	3	38	19	+19	8	6	5	23	20	+3

Last updated: 11 May.
Source: Premier League

==== Results by matchday ====
Matchday	1	2	3	4	5	6	7	8	9	10	11	12	13	14	15	16	17	18	19	20	21	22	23	24	25	26	27	28	29	30	31	32	33	34	35	36	37	38
Ground	A	H	A	H	A	H	A	H	A	H	A	H	H	A	A	H	A	H	H	A	H	A	A	H	A	A	H	H	H	A	A	H	A	H	H	A	H	A
Result	D	D	D	W	W	W	L	W	W	D	D	D	W	W	D	W	W	L	W	D	W	D	L	W	L	L	W	W	W	W	W	W	W	L	W	L	L	W
Position	7	13	15	9	5	4	5	6	4	7	5	5	4	5	5	4	4	5	4	5	4	6	6	5	6	7	6	6	5	5	5	5	4	5	5	5	5	5

Source: Statto.com
A = Away; H = Home; W = Win; D = Draw; L = Loss

==== Matches ====
17 August 2013 1	Norwich City	2–2	Everton	Norwich
15:00 BST	Martin (yellow card) 44'; Whittaker 51'; Turner (yellow card) 59'; Van Wolfswinkel 71'	Report	Barkley 61'; Coleman 65'	Stadium: Carrow Road; Attendance: 26,824; Referee: Michael Oliver

24 August 2013 2	Everton	0–0	West Bromwich Albion	Liverpool
15:00 BST	Barkley (yellow card) 85'	Report	Mulumbu (yellow card) 28'	Stadium: Goodison Park; Attendance: 36,410; Referee: Roger East

31 August 2013 3	Cardiff City	0–0	Everton	Cardiff
15:00 BST	Connolly (yellow card) 49'	Report	Barkley (yellow card) 38'	Stadium: Cardiff City Stadium; Attendance: 27,344; Referee: Anthony Taylor

14 September 2013 4	Everton	1–0	Chelsea	Liverpool
17:30 BST	Naismith 45+1'	Report	Ivanović (yellow card) 65'; Hazard (yellow card) 79'; David Luiz (yellow card) 82'; Mikel (yellow card) 86'	Stadium: Goodison Park; Attendance: 36,034; Referee: Howard Webb

21 September 2013 5	West Ham United	2–3	Everton	London
15:00 BST	Morrison 31', (yellow card) 37'; Collins (yellow card) 61'; Noble (yellow card) 68' (yellow-red card) 81' (goal) 76' (pen.)	Report	Barkley (yellow card) 45'; Baines 62', 83'; Lukaku 85'	Stadium: Boleyn Ground; Attendance: 34,952; Referee: Lee Mason

30 September 2013 6	Everton	3–2	Newcastle United	Liverpool
20:00 BST	Lukaku 5', 37'; Baines (yellow card) 17'; Barkley 25'; Mirallas (yellow card) 44'; Barry (yellow card) 80'	Report	Cabaye 51'; Tioté (yellow card) 55'; Rémy 89'	Stadium: Goodison Park; Attendance: 33,495; Referee: Phil Dowd

5 October 2013 7	Manchester City	3–1	Everton	Manchester
12:45 BST	Negredo 17'; Kompany (yellow card) 23'; Agüero 45'; Milner (yellow card) 45+4'; Howard 69' (o.g.); Silva (yellow card) 74'; Zabaleta (yellow card) 78'; Fernandinho (yellow card) 89'	Report	Lukaku 16'; Distin (yellow card) 69'; Howard (yellow card) 70'; Coleman (yellow card) 80'; Naismith (yellow card) 87'	Stadium: City of Manchester Stadium; Attendance: 47,267; Referee: Jonathan Moss

19 October 2013 8	Everton	2–1	Hull City	Liverpool
15:00 BST	Barry 8', (yellow card) 29'; Osman (yellow card) 55'; Pienaar 57'; Baines (yellow card) 90+4'	Report	Sagbo 30'; Huddlestone (yellow card) 90+1'	Stadium: Goodison Park; Attendance: 38,828; Referee: Neil Swarbrick

26 October 2013 9	Aston Villa	0–2	Everton	Birmingham
15:00 BST		Report	McCarthy (yellow card) 62'; Lukaku 68'; Osman 81'; Howard (yellow card) 87'	Stadium: Villa Park; Attendance: 35,154; Referee: Anthony Taylor

3 November 2013 10	Everton	0–0	Tottenham Hotspur	Liverpool
13:30 GMT	Howard (yellow card) 10'; McCarthy (yellow card) 17'; Mirallas (yellow card) 48'; Lukaku (yellow card) 78'	Report	Paulinho (yellow card) 68'	Stadium: Goodison Park; Attendance: 38,378; Referee: Kevin Friend

9 November 2013 11	Crystal Palace	0–0	Everton	London
15:00 GMT	Jedinak (yellow card) 87'	Report		Stadium: Selhurst Park; Attendance: 25,231; Referee: Craig Pawson

23 November 2013 12	Everton	3–3	Liverpool	Liverpool
12:45 GMT	Mirallas 8', (yellow card) 36'; Barkley (yellow card) 31'; Lukaku 72', 82'; Stones (yellow card) 83'; Osman (yellow card) 88'	Report	Coutinho 5'; Suárez 19', (yellow card) 79'; Allen (yellow card) 62'; Lucas (yellow card) 67'; Sturridge 89'	Stadium: Goodison Park; Attendance: 39,576; Referee: Phil Dowd

30 November 2013 13	Everton	4–0	Stoke City	Liverpool
15:00 GMT	Deulofeu 45'; Coleman 49'; Oviedo 58'; Lukaku 79'	Report	Cameron (yellow card) 42'; Whelan (yellow card) 46'; Pieters (yellow card) 64'	Stadium: Goodison Park; Attendance: 35,513; Referee: Mike Jones

4 December 2013 14	Manchester United	0–1	Everton	Manchester
19:45 GMT	Rooney (yellow card) 61'; Giggs (yellow card) 90+3'	Report	Oviedo 86'	Stadium: Old Trafford; Attendance: 75,210; Referee: Martin Atkinson

8 December 2013 15	Arsenal	1–1	Everton	London
16:00 GMT	Özil 80'	Report	Barry (yellow card) 43'; McCarthy (yellow card) 61'; Howard (yellow card) 77'; Deulofeu 84', (yellow card) 89'	Stadium: Emirates Stadium; Attendance: 60,001; Referee: Howard Webb

14 December 2013 16	Everton	4–1	Fulham	Liverpool
15:00 GMT	Osman 18'; Coleman 73'; Pienaar (yellow card) 75'; Barry 84'; Mirallas 90+1'	Report	Berbatov 67' (pen.); Dejagah (yellow card) 70'; Senderos (yellow card) 90'	Stadium: Goodison Park; Attendance: 33,796; Referee: Anthony Taylor

22 December 2013 17	Swansea City	1–2	Everton	Swansea
16:00 GMT	Oviedo 70' (o.g.); Davies (yellow card) 83'	Report	Coleman 66'; Barkley 84'	Stadium: Liberty Stadium; Attendance: 20,695; Referee: Lee Mason

26 December 2013 18	Everton	0–1	Sunderland	Liverpool
15:00 GMT	Howard (red card) 23'; Barry (yellow card) 42'	Report	Ki 25' (pen.)	Stadium: Goodison Park; Attendance: 39,193; Referee: Lee Probert

29 December 2013 19	Everton	2–1	Southampton	Liverpool
13:30 GMT	Coleman 9'; Oviedo (yellow card) 51'; Lukaku 74'; McCarthy (yellow card) 77'	Report	Cork (yellow card) 62'; Lambert (yellow card) 65'; Ramírez 72', (yellow card) 72'; Lallana (yellow card) 89'	Stadium: Goodison Park; Attendance: 39,092; Referee: Mark Clattenburg

1 January 2014 20	Stoke City	1–1	Everton	Stoke-on-Trent
15:00 GMT	Assaidi 49'; Cameron (yellow card) 51'; Shawcross (yellow card) 57'; Whelan (yellow card) 64'; Pennant (yellow card) 90+1'	Report	Mirallas (yellow card) 67'; Baines 90+2' (pen.)	Stadium: Britannia Stadium; Attendance: 25,832; Referee: Andre Marriner

11 January 2014 21	Everton	2–0	Norwich City	Liverpool
15:00 GMT	Barry 23'; Stones (yellow card) 45'; Mirallas 59'	Report	Bennett (yellow card) 63'; Bassong (yellow card) 90'	Stadium: Goodison Park; Attendance: 36,827; Referee: Kevin Friend

20 January 2014 22	West Bromwich Albion	1–1	Everton	West Bromwich
20:00 GMT	Yacob (yellow card) 35'; Morrison (yellow card) 44'; Ridgewell (yellow card) 55'; Lugano 75'	Report	Mirallas 41', (yellow card) 90+2'; Barry (yellow card) 51'	Stadium: The Hawthorns; Attendance: 24,184; Referee: Michael Oliver

28 January 2014 23	Liverpool	4–0	Everton	Liverpool
20:00 GMT	Gerrard 21'; Sturridge 33', 35'; Suárez 50'	Report	Pienaar (yellow card) 38'; Barry (yellow card) 45+2'; Mirallas (yellow card) 52'	Stadium: Anfield; Attendance: 44,450; Referee: Martin Atkinson

1 February 2014 24	Everton	2–1	Aston Villa	Liverpool
15:00 GMT	Naismith 74'; Mirallas 85'; Baines (yellow card) 86'	Report	Bacuna 34'	Stadium: Goodison Park; Attendance: 39,469; Referee: Robert Madley

9 February 2014 25	Tottenham Hotspur	1–0	Everton	London
13:30 GMT	Adebayor 65'; Dembélé (yellow card) 87'	Report		Stadium: White Hart Lane; Attendance: 35,944; Referee: Mark Clattenburg

22 February 2014 26	Chelsea	1–0	Everton	London
12:45 GMT	Oscar (yellow card) 9'; Lampard 90+3'	Report	Barry (yellow card) 82'; Jagielka (yellow card) 90+2'	Stadium: Stamford Bridge; Attendance: 41,580; Referee: Lee Probert

1 March 2014 27	Everton	1–0	West Ham United	Liverpool
15:00 GMT	Lukaku 81'; Baines (yellow card) 90'	Report	Tomkins (yellow card) 30'	Stadium: Goodison Park; Attendance: 38,286; Referee: Jonathan Moss

15 March 2014 28	Everton	2–1	Cardiff City	Liverpool
15:00 GMT	Osman (yellow card) 58'; Deulofeu 59'; Coleman 90+3'	Report	Théophile-Catherine (yellow card) 45'; Medel (yellow card) 58'; Cala 68'; Campbell (yellow card) 76'	Stadium: Goodison Park; Attendance: 38,018; Referee: Roger East

22 March 2014 29	Everton	3–2	Swansea City	Liverpool
15:00 GMT	Baines 20' (pen.); Lukaku 53'; Barkley 58'	Report	Bony 33'; Williams 90+2'	Stadium: Goodison Park; Attendance: 36,260; Referee: Michael Oliver

25 March 2014 30	Newcastle United	0–3	Everton	Newcastle
19:45 GMT		Report	Barkley 24'; Lukaku 49'; Barry (yellow card) 64'; Osman 85'	Stadium: St James' Park; Attendance: 47,622; Referee: Lee Mason

30 March 2014 31	Fulham	1–3	Everton	London
13:30 BST	Riether (yellow card) 23'; Dejagah 71'	Report	Coleman (yellow card) 31'; Stockdale 50' (o.g.); Baines (yellow card) 75'; Mirallas 79'; Naismith 87'	Stadium: Craven Cottage; Attendance: 25,454; Referee: Anthony Taylor

6 April 2014 32	Everton	3–0	Arsenal	Liverpool
13:30 BST	Osman (yellow card) 6'; Naismith 14'; Lukaku 34'; Arteta 61' (o.g.)	Report	Flamini (yellow card) 43'; Arteta (yellow card) 90'	Stadium: Goodison Park; Attendance: 39,504; Referee: Martin Atkinson

12 April 2014 33	Sunderland	0–1	Everton	Sunderland
15:07 BST	Johnson (yellow card) 19'; Bardsley (yellow card) 54'; Larsson (yellow card) 88'	Report	Coleman (yellow card) 53'; Brown 75' (o.g.)	Stadium: Stadium of Light; Attendance: 38,445; Referee: Lee Probert

16 April 2014 34	Everton	2–3	Crystal Palace	Liverpool
19:45 BST	Naismith 61'; Baines (yellow card) 65'; Mirallas 86'	Report	Puncheon 23', (yellow card) 90+3'; Delaney (yellow card) 44'; Dann 49'; Jerome 73'	Stadium: Goodison Park; Attendance: 39,333; Referee: Andre Marriner

20 April 2014 35	Everton	2–0	Manchester United	Liverpool
16:10 BST	Baines 28' (pen.); Mirallas 43'; Barkley (yellow card) 47'; McCarthy (yellow card) 60'	Report	Jones (yellow card) 27'; Smalling (yellow card) 49'	Stadium: Goodison Park; Attendance: 39,436; Referee: Mark Clattenburg

26 April 2014 36	Southampton	2–0	Everton	Southampton
12:45 BST	Alcaraz 1' (o.g.); Coleman 31' (o.g.)	Report	Barry (yellow card) 45'; Osman (yellow card) 62'	Stadium: St Mary's Stadium; Attendance: 31,313; Referee: Michael Oliver

3 May 2014 37	Everton	2–3	Manchester City	Liverpool
17:30 BST	Barkley 11'; Lukaku 65'	Report	Agüero 22'; García (yellow card) 39'; Džeko 43', 48', (yellow card) 83'; Demichelis (yellow card) 66'	Stadium: Goodison Park; Attendance: 39,454; Referee: Lee Probert

11 May 2014 38	Hull City	0–2	Everton	Kingston upon Hull
15:00 BST		Report	McCarthy 9'; Jagielka (yellow card) 23'; Lukaku 46'	Stadium: KC Stadium; Attendance: 24,848; Referee: Howard Webb

=== League Cup ===
28 August 2013 Second round	Everton	2–1 (a.e.t.)	Stevenage	Liverpool
19:45 BST	Oviedo (yellow card) 45+2'; Deulofeu 45+3'; Fellaini 115'	Report	Freeman 36'; Gray (yellow card) 63'; Doughty (yellow card) 83'; Hartley (yellow card) 107'	Stadium: Goodison Park; Attendance: 22,730; Referee: Keith Stroud

24 September 2013 Third round	Fulham	2–1	Everton	London
20:00 BST	Parker (yellow card) 16'; Berbatov 54'; Bent 68'	Report	Naismith 12'; Gibson (yellow card) 35'; Coleman (yellow card) 79'; McCarthy (yellow card) 84'; Stones (yellow card) 90+2'	Stadium: Craven Cottage; Attendance: 14,627; Referee: Martin Atkinson

=== FA Cup ===
4 January 2014 Third round	Everton	4–0	Queens Park Rangers	Liverpool
15:00 GMT	Barkley 35'; Jelavić 44', 68'; Coleman 76'	Report		Stadium: Goodison Park; Attendance: 32,283; Referee: Howard Webb

25 January 2014 Fourth round	Stevenage	0–4	Everton	Stevenage
17:30 GMT	Hartley (yellow card) 38'; Smith (yellow card) 60'	Report	Naismith 5', 32' (yellow card) 63'; Heitinga 55'; Gueye 84'	Stadium: Broadhall Way; Attendance: 6,913; Referee: Anthony Taylor

16 February 2014 Fifth round	Everton	3–1	Swansea City	Liverpool
13:30 GMT	Traoré 4'; Naismith 65'; Baines 72' (pen.)	Report	De Guzmán 15'; Amat (yellow card) 82'; Lita (yellow card) 87'; Cañas (yellow card) 87'	Stadium: Goodison Park; Attendance: 31,498; Referee: Kevin Friend

8 March 2014 Sixth round	Arsenal	4–1	Everton	London
12:45 GMT	Özil 7'; Flamini (yellow card) 24'; Giroud (yellow card) 68', (goal) 83', 85'; Arteta 68' (pen.)	Report	32' Lukaku; (yellow card) 69' McCarthy	Stadium: Emirates Stadium; Attendance: 59,719; Referee: Mark Clattenburg

== Players ==
=== First team squad ===
As of 26 March 2014.

Note: Flags indicate national team as defined under FIFA eligibility rules; some limited exceptions apply. Players may hold more than one non-FIFA nationality.

No.	Pos.	Nation	Player
1	GK	ESP	Joel Robles
2	DF	ENG	Tony Hibbert
3	DF	ENG	Leighton Baines
4	MF	IRL	Darron Gibson
6	DF	ENG	Phil Jagielka (captain)
7	MF	IRL	Aiden McGeady
8	MF	CRC	Bryan Oviedo
9	FW	CIV	Arouna Koné
10	FW	ESP	Gerard Deulofeu (on loan from Barcelona)
11	FW	BEL	Kevin Mirallas
14	FW	SCO	Steven Naismith
15	DF	FRA	Sylvain Distin
16	MF	IRL	James McCarthy
17	FW	BEL	Romelu Lukaku (on loan from Chelsea)
18	MF	ENG	Gareth Barry (on loan from Manchester City)
19	MF	SEN	Magaye Gueye

No.	Pos.	Nation	Player
20	MF	ENG	Ross Barkley
21	MF	ENG	Leon Osman (vice-captain)
22	MF	RSA	Steven Pienaar
23	DF	IRL	Séamus Coleman
24	GK	USA	Tim Howard
26	DF	ENG	John Stones
28	FW	CIV	Lacina Traoré (on loan from Monaco)
29	DF	ENG	Luke Garbutt
32	DF	PAR	Antolín Alcaraz
35	FW	ENG	Conor McAleny
36	DF	ENG	Tyias Browning
39	MF	ENG	Conor Grant
40	DF	ENG	Ibou Touray
41	FW	ENG	Chris Long
42	GK	ENG	Mason Springthorpe
45	GK	CZE	Jindřich Staněk

==== Out on loan ====
Note: Flags indicate national team as defined under FIFA eligibility rules; some limited exceptions apply. Players may hold more than one non-FIFA nationality.

No.	Pos.	Nation	Player
27	FW	GRE	Apostolos Vellios (at Blackpool)
30	MF	POR	Francisco Júnior (at Strømsgodset)
31	MF	SCO	Matthew Kennedy (at Milton Keynes Dons)
33	MF	ENG	John Lundstram (at Leyton Orient)

No.	Pos.	Nation	Player
34	DF	IRL	Shane Duffy (at Yeovil Town)
37	FW	ENG	Hallam Hope (at Bury)
38	DF	ENG	Matthew Pennington (at Tranmere Rovers)

=== Player awards ===
- Player of the Season – Séamus Coleman
- Players' Player of the Season – Séamus Coleman
- Young Player of the Season – Ross Barkley
- Reserve / U21 Player of the Season – Tyias Browning
- Academy Player of the Season – Ryan Ledson
- Goal of the Season – Ross Barkley vs. Manchester City

== Statistics ==
=== Appearances ===
As of match played 11 May 2014.

No.	Pos	Nat	Player	Total		Premier League		FA Cup		League Cup	
No.	Pos	Nat	Player	Apps	Goals	Apps	Goals	Apps	Goals	Apps	Goals
1	GK	(Spain) ESP	Joel Robles	8	0	1+1	0	4	0	2	0
2	DF	(England) ENG	Tony Hibbert	4	0	0+1	0	1+1	0	1	0
3	DF	(England) ENG	Leighton Baines	35	6	32	5	3	1	0	0
4	MF	(Republic of Ireland) IRL	Darron Gibson	2	0	0+1	0	0	0	1	0
6	DF	(England) ENG	Phil Jagielka	30	0	26	0	2	0	1+1	0
7	MF	(Republic of Ireland) IRL	Aiden McGeady	18	0	4+12	0	1+1	0	0	0
8	MF	(Costa Rica) CRC	Bryan Oviedo	13	2	8+1	2	2	0	2	0
9	FW	(Ivory Coast) CIV	Arouna Koné	6	0	0+5	0	0	0	1	0
10	FW	(Spain) ESP	Gerard Deulofeu	29	4	9+16	3	0+2	0	2	1
11	FW	(Belgium) BEL	Kevin Mirallas	37	8	28+4	8	3+1	0	0+1	0
14	FW	(Scotland) SCO	Steven Naismith	36	9	13+18	5	2+1	3	2	1
15	DF	(France) FRA	Sylvain Distin	37	0	33	0	2	0	1+1	0
16	MF	(Republic of Ireland) IRL	James McCarthy	39	1	31+3	1	4	0	1	0
17	FW	(Belgium) BEL	Romelu Lukaku	33	16	29+2	15	1	1	1	0
18	MF	(England) ENG	Gareth Barry	37	3	32	3	4	0	0+1	0
19	FW	(Senegal) SEN	Magaye Gueye	1	1	0	0	0+1	1	0	0
20	MF	(England) ENG	Ross Barkley	38	7	25+9	6	3	1	1	0
21	MF	(England) ENG	Leon Osman	43	3	27+11	3	1+3	0	1	0
22	MF	(South Africa) RSA	Steven Pienaar	25	1	19+4	1	2	0	0	0
23	DF	(Republic of Ireland) IRL	Séamus Coleman	41	7	36	6	3	1	1+1	0
24	GK	(United States) USA	Tim Howard	37	0	37	0	0	0	0	0
26	DF	(England) ENG	John Stones	26	0	15+6	0	3	0	2	0
27	FW	(Greece) GRE	Apostolos Vellios	0	0	0	0	0	0	0	0
28	FW	(Ivory Coast) CIV	Lacina Traoré	2	1	0+1	0	1	1	0	0
29	DF	(England) ENG	Luke Garbutt	1	0	0+1	0	0	0	0	0
30	MF	(Portugal) POR	Francisco Júnior	0	0	0	0	0	0	0	0
31	MF	(Scotland) SCO	Matthew Kennedy	0	0	0	0	0	0	0	0
32	DF	(Paraguay) PAR	Antolín Alcaraz	7	0	5+1	0	1	0	0	0
33	MF	(England) ENG	John Lundstram	0	0	0	0	0	0	0	0
34	DF	(Republic of Ireland) IRL	Shane Duffy	0	0	0	0	0	0	0	0
35	FW	(England) ENG	Conor McAleny	0	0	0	0	0	0	0	0
36	DF	(England) ENG	Tyias Browning	0	0	0	0	0	0	0	0
37	FW	(England) ENG	Hallam Hope	0	0	0	0	0	0	0	0
38	DF	(England) ENG	Matthew Pennington	0	0	0	0	0	0	0	0
39	MF	(England) ENG	Conor Grant	0	0	0	0	0	0	0	0
40	DF	(England) ENG	Ibou Touray	0	0	0	0	0	0	0	0
41	FW	(England) ENG	Chris Long	0	0	0	0	0	0	0	0
42	GK	(England) ENG	Mason Springthorpe	0	0	0	0	0	0	0	0
45	GK	(Czech Republic) CZE	Jindřich Staněk	0	0	0	0	0	0	0	0
Players who made appearances but left the club during the season:
5	DF	(Netherlands) NED	John Heitinga	5	1	0+1	0	0+2	1	2	0
7	FW	(Croatia) CRO	Nikica Jelavić	10	2	5+4	0	1	2	0	0
25	MF	(Belgium) BEL	Marouane Fellaini	4	1	3	0	0	0	0+1	1
28	FW	(Nigeria) NGR	Victor Anichebe	1	0	0+1	0	0	0	0	0

=== Goalscorers ===
As of match played 11 May 2014.

R.	Name	Premier League	FA Cup	League Cup	Total
1	Romelu Lukaku	15	1	0	16
2	Steven Naismith	5	3	1	9
3	Kevin Mirallas	8	0	0	8
4	Ross Barkley	6	1	0	7
4	Séamus Coleman	6	1	0	7
6	Leighton Baines	5	1	0	6
7	Gerard Deulofeu	3	0	1	4
8	Gareth Barry	3	0	0	3
8	Leon Osman	3	0	0	3
10	Nikica Jelavić	0	2	0	2
10	Bryan Oviedo	2	0	0	2
12	Marouane Fellaini	0	0	1	1
12	Magaye Gueye	0	1	0	1
12	John Heitinga	0	1	0	1
12	James McCarthy	1	0	0	1
12	Steven Pienaar	1	0	0	1
12	Lacina Traoré	0	1	0	1
Own Goals		3	0	0	3
Total		61	12	3	76

Source: Match reports in Results

=== Disciplinary record ===
R.	Name	Premier League			FA Cup			League Cup			Total		
R.	Name	Yellow card	(yellow card) (yellow-red card)	Red card	Yellow card	(yellow card) (yellow-red card)	Red card	Yellow card	(yellow card) (yellow-red card)	Red card	Yellow card	(yellow card) (yellow-red card)	Red card
1	Gareth Barry	10	0	0	0	0	0	0	0	0	10	0	0
2	Tim Howard	4	0	1	0	0	0	0	0	0	4	0	1
3	Leighton Baines	6	0	0	0	0	0	0	0	0	6	0	0
3	James McCarthy	4	0	0	1	0	0	1	0	0	6	0	0
5	Ross Barkley	5	0	0	0	0	0	0	0	0	5	0	0
5	Kevin Mirallas	5	0	0	0	0	0	0	0	0	5	0	0
7	Séamus Coleman	3	0	0	0	0	0	1	0	0	4	0	0
7	Leon Osman	4	0	0	0	0	0	0	0	0	4	0	0
9	Sylvain Distin	2	0	0	0	0	0	0	0	0	2	0	0
9	Phil Jagielka	2	0	0	0	0	0	0	0	0	2	0	0
9	Steven Naismith	1	0	0	1	0	0	0	0	0	2	0	0
9	Bryan Oviedo	1	0	0	0	0	0	1	0	0	2	0	0
9	Steven Pienaar	2	0	0	0	0	0	0	0	0	2	0	0
9	John Stones	1	0	0	0	0	0	1	0	0	2	0	0
15	Gerard Deulofeu	1	0	0	0	0	0	0	0	0	1	0	0
15	Darron Gibson	1	0	0	0	0	0	0	0	0	1	0	0
15	Romelu Lukaku	1	0	0	0	0	0	0	0	0	1	0	0
Total		48	0	1	2	0	0	5	0	0	55	0	1

Last updated: match played 11 May 2014
Source: Match reports in Results

=== Home attendances ===
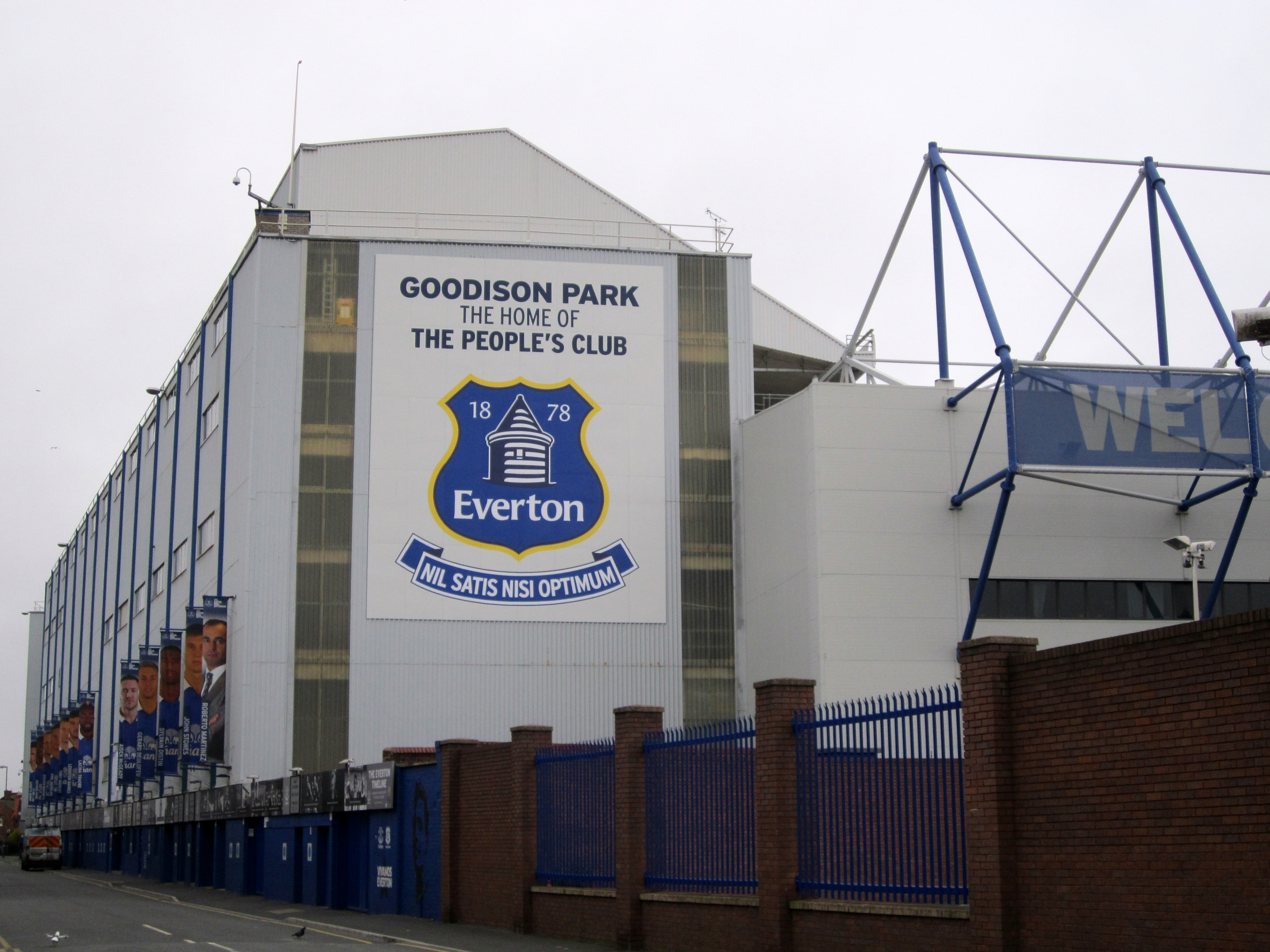
Goodison Park – Everton's home ground

"Attendances have been fantastic this season. If you look at the past four or five seasons and look at the number of full houses and look at average attendances, then the trend has been very positive. In 2013/14, we've had nine full houses and we're very pleased and very proud to have had that. We've also had an average attendance of well over 37,500, and I think as everybody knows, when we get to 36,000 at Goodison we start selling restricted view seats. To be substantially ahead of that figure is a great achievement. What it means is we've now set a very ambitious target for next season. That target is that three out of every four seats will be pre-sold before the first ball of the season is kicked. When you add in hospitality sales and the Season Ticket target, we're looking at 30,000 tickets already pre-sold, and that would be really great news for the football club."

— Robert Elstone, Everton's Chief Executive Officer, on the season's attendances at Goodison Park, 6 May 2014.

Correct as of match played 3 May 2014.
Win Draw Loss

Comp	Date	Score	Opponent	Attendance
Premier League	24 August 2013	0–0	West Bromwich Albion	36,410
League Cup	28 August 2013	2–1	Stevenage	22,730
Premier League	14 September 2013	1–0	Chelsea	36,034
Premier League	30 September 2013	3–2	Newcastle	33,495
Premier League	19 October 2013	2–1	Hull City	38,828
Premier League	3 November 2013	0–0	Tottenham Hotspur	38,378
Premier League	23 November 2013	3–3	Liverpool	39,576
Premier League	30 November 2013	4–0	Stoke City	35,513
Premier League	14 December 2013	4–1	Fulham	33,796
Premier League	26 December 2013	0–1	Sunderland	39,193
Premier League	29 December 2013	2–1	Southampton	39,092
FA Cup	4 January 2014	4–0	Queens Park Rangers	32,283
Premier League	11 January 2014	2–0	Norwich City	36,827
Premier League	1 February 2014	2–1	Aston Villa	39,469
FA Cup	16 February 2014	3–1	Swansea City	31,498
Premier League	1 March 2014	1–0	West Ham United	38,286
Premier League	15 March 2014	2–1	Cardiff City	38,018
Premier League	22 March 2014	3–2	Swansea City	36,260
Premier League	6 April 2014	3–0	Arsenal	39,504
Premier League	16 April 2014	2–3	Crystal Palace	39,333
Premier League	20 April 2014	2–0	Manchester United	39,436
Premier League	3 May 2014	2–3	Manchester City	39,454
			Total attendance	803,413
			Total league attendance	716,902
			Average attendance	36,519
			Average league attendance	37,732

Source: Match reports in Results

== Transfers ==
=== In ===
Player	From	Date	Fee	Ref.
(Ivory Coast) Arouna Koné	(England) Wigan Athletic	8 July 2013	£6m	
(Paraguay) Antolín Alcaraz	Unattached	9 July 2013	Free	
(Spain) Joel Robles	(Spain) Atlético Madrid	9 July 2013	Undisclosed (~£3m)	
(Republic of Ireland) James McCarthy	(England) Wigan Athletic	2 September 2013	£13m	
(Republic of Ireland) Aiden McGeady	(Russia) Spartak Moscow	11 January 2014	Undisclosed (~£2m)	
(Czech Republic) Jindřich Staněk	(Czech Republic) Sparta Prague	31 January 2014	Undisclosed	

=== Out ===
Player	To	Date	Fee	Ref.
(England) Jake Bidwell	(England) Brentford	17 June 2013	Undisclosed (~£1m)	
(Sweden) Johan Hammar	(Sweden) Malmö FF	18 June 2013	Free	
(Germany) Thomas Hitzlsperger	Released	1 July 2013	Free	
(Republic of Ireland) Sam Kelly	Released	1 July 2013	Free	
(Slovakia) Ján Mucha	Released	1 July 2013	Free	
(England) Phil Neville	Retired	1 July 2013	Free	
(Nigeria) Victor Anichebe	(England) West Bromwich Albion	2 September 2013	£6m	
(Belgium) Marouane Fellaini	(England) Manchester United	2 September 2013	£27.5m	
(Croatia) Nikica Jelavić	(England) Hull City	15 January 2014	Undisclosed (~£6.5m)	
(Netherlands) John Heitinga	(England) Fulham	31 January 2014	Free	

=== Loans in ===
Player	From	Date	Return date	Ref.
(Spain) Gerard Deulofeu	(Spain) Barcelona	10 July 2013	End of season	
(England) Gareth Barry	(England) Manchester City	2 September 2013	End of season	
(Belgium) Romelu Lukaku	(England) Chelsea	2 September 2013	End of season	
(Ivory Coast) Lacina Traoré	(France) Monaco	24 January 2014	End of season	

=== Loans out ===
Player	To	Date	Return date	Ref.
(England) Conor McAleny	(England) Brentford	25 July 2013	2 September 2013 (Note: Loan was originally scheduled until 6 January 2014, but was cancelled early due to injury.)	
(Portugal) Francisco Júnior	(Netherlands) Vitesse	2 September 2013	20 February 2014 (Note: Loan was originally scheduled until the end of the season, but was cancelled early to allow a loan move to Strømsgodset IF.)	
(England) Luke Garbutt	(England) Colchester United	13 September 2013	28 January 2014	
(Republic of Ireland) Shane Duffy	(England) Yeovil Town	26 September 2013	End of season	
(England) John Lundstram	(England) Yeovil Town	28 November 2013	10 March 2014 (Note: Loan was originally scheduled until the end of the season, but was ended early.)	
(England) Hallam Hope	(England) Northampton Town	1 January 2014	30 January 2014	
(England) Matthew Pennington	(England) Tranmere Rovers	1 January 2014	24 February 2014	
(Scotland) Matthew Kennedy	(England) Tranmere Rovers	9 January 2014	24 February 2014	
(England) Tyias Browning	(England) Wigan Athletic	10 January 2014	10 February 2014	
(England) Mason Springthorpe	(England) Woking	20 January 2014	20 February 2014	
(Portugal) Francisco Júnior	(Norway) Strømsgodset	20 February 2014	End of season	
(Scotland) Matthew Kennedy	(England) Milton Keynes Dons	26 March 2014	End of season	
(Greece) Apostolos Vellios	(England) Blackpool	27 March 2014	End of season	
(England) Hallam Hope	(England) Bury	27 March 2014	End of season	
(England) John Lundstram	(England) Leyton Orient	27 March 2014	24 April 2014	
(England) Matthew Pennington	(England) Tranmere Rovers	27 March 2014	End of season	
