= 2008–09 Everton F.C. season =

English football club season

Everton
2008–09 season
- Chairman: Bill Kenwright
- Manager: David Moyes
- Premier League: 5th
- FA Cup: Runners-up
- League Cup: Third Round
- UEFA Cup: First Round
- Top goalscorer: League: Marouane Fellaini; Tim Cahill (8); All: Marouane Fellaini; Tim Cahill (9)
- Highest home attendance: 39,574 v (27 Sept vs Liverpool)
- Lowest home attendance: 28,312 v (17 Sept vs Standard Liège)
Home colours	Away colours	Third colours

The 2008–09 Everton F.C. season was Everton's 17th season in the Premier League, and their 55th consecutive season in the top division of English football. The club's kit was provided by Umbro, and the sponsor was Chang beer.

== Kits ==
Home	Alt Home	Alt. Home 2	Away	Third

== Review and events ==
=== Monthly events ===
This is a list of the significant events to occur at the club during the 2008–09 season, presented in chronological order. This list does not include transfers, which are listed in the transfers section below, or match results, which are in the results section. However it does summarise the transfers made by Everton in the summer. It also includes Cup Draws.

July:

- 4 - Steve Round is announced as Everton's new assistant manager.
- 10 - The Guardian report on two further mortgages taken out by Everton against future bSkyb television revenue.
- 18 - Everton shareholders deliver a petition to the club demanding an Extraordinary General Meeting having achieved over 20% of the support necessary to call such a meeting.
- 25 - Club captain Phil Neville signs a new four-year contract to keep him at the club until 2012.
- 27 - Sporting CP reject Everton's £11.8 million bid for midfielder João Moutinho.
- 29 - Everton CEO Keith Wyness resigns. No official reason is stated at the time, except that it is not in connection with Everton's planned new stadium in Kirkby.

August:

- 16 - Jose Baxter becomes Everton's youngest player to make a competitive appearance when he comes on against Blackburn Rovers in the Premier League. Baxter was aged 16 years and 191 days.
- 23 - Jose Baxter becomes Everton's youngest player to be selected for a competitive match, when he starts against West Bromwich Albion in the Premier League. Baxter was aged 16 years and 198 days.
- 28 - Everton are drawn with Standard Liège in the first round of the UEFA Cup, with the first game being at Goodison Park.
- 29 - Everton are drawn away to Blackburn in the third round of the League Cup
- 31 - Everton break its transfer record after acquiring Marouane Fellaini for £15 million, £3.75 million more than Yakubu was purchased for from Middlesbrough FC in 2007. This was the club's fifth signing of August, following Lars Jacobsen, Louis Saha, Segundo Castillo and Carlo Nash.

== Final league table ==
Pos	Team	Pld	W	D	L	GF	GA	GD	Pts	Qualification or relegation
3	Chelsea	38	25	8	5	68	24	+44	83	Qualification for the Champions League group stage (Note: Since both finalists of the FA Cup (Chelsea and Everton) and the League Cup winners (Manchester United) qualified for the European competitions based on their league position, the sixth-placed team (Aston Villa) received a berth in the Europa League play-off round and the seventh-placed team (Fulham) received a berth in the Europa League third qualifying round.)
4	Arsenal	38	20	12	6	68	37	+31	72	Qualification for the Champions League play-off round
5	Everton	38	17	12	9	55	37	+18	63	Qualification for the Europa League play-off round
6	Aston Villa	38	17	11	10	54	48	+6	62	Qualification for the Europa League play-off round
7	Fulham	38	14	11	13	39	34	+5	53	Qualification for the Europa League third qualifying round

Source: Barclays Premier League
Rules for classification: 1) points; 2) goal difference; 3) number of goals scored.

== Squad details ==
=== Players information ===
No.	Name	Nat.	Place of birth	Date of birth	Club apps.	Club goals	Int. caps	Int. goals	Previous club	Date joined	Fee
1	Carlo Nash	(England)	Bolton	13 September 1973	-	-	-	-	Wigan Athletic	1 September 2008	Undisclosed
2	Tony Hibbert	(England)	Huyton	20 February 1981	164	-	-	-	N/A	1 August 2000	Trainee
3	Leighton Baines	(England)	Kirkby	11 December 1984	24	-	-	-	Wigan Athletic	7 August 2007	£6,000,000
4	Joseph Yobo	(Nigeria)	Port Harcourt	6 September 1980	178	6	59	4	Marseille	22 May 2003	£3,500,000
5	Joleon Lescott	(England)	Birmingham	16 August 1982	78	12	5	-	Wolverhampton Wanderers	14 June 2006	£5,000,000
6	Phil Jagielka	(England)	Manchester	7 August 1982	36	1	1	-	Sheffield United	4 July 2007	£4,000,000
7	Andy van der Meyde	(Netherlands)	Arnhem	30 September 1979	18	-	18	1	Inter Milan	31 August 2005	£2,000,000
8	Segundo Castillo	(Ecuador)	San Lorenzo	15 May 1982	-	-	33	2	Red Star Belgrade	28 August 2008	Loan
9	Louis Saha	(France)	Paris	8 August 1978	-	-	18	4	Manchester United	1 September 2008	Undisclosed
10	Mikel Arteta	(Spain)	San Sebastián	26 March 1982	106	13	7	1	Real Sociedad	1 July 2005	£2,500,000
12	Iain Turner	(Scotland)	Stirling	26 January 1984	4	-	-	-	Stirling Albion	1 July 2003	£50,000
14	James Vaughan	(England)	Birmingham	14 July 1988	26	6	-	-	N/A	1 July 2004	Trainee
15	Lars Jacobsen	(Denmark)	Odense	20 September 1979	-	-	16	-	1. FC Nürnberg	26 August 2008	Free
17	Tim Cahill	(Australia)	Sydney	6 December 1979	101	29	28	13	Millwall	23 July 2004	£1,500,000
18	Phil Neville	(England)	Bury	21 January 1977	108	3	59	-	Manchester United	4 August 2005	£3,500,000
19	Nuno Valente	(Portugal)	Lisbon	12 September 1974	45	-	33	1	Porto	30 August 2005	£1,500,000
20	Steven Pienaar	(South Africa)	Johannesburg	17 March 1982	35	2	34	2	Borussia Dortmund	24 April 2007	£2,000,000
21	Leon Osman	(England)	Wigan	17 May 1981	134	18	-	-	N/A	1 August 2000	Trainee
22	Yakubu	(Nigeria)	Benin City	22 November 1982	39	22	41	17	Middlesbrough	29 August 2007	£11,250,000
24	Tim Howard	(United States)	North Brunswick	6 March 1979	74	-	30	-	Manchester United	14 February 2007	£3,000,000
25	Marouane Fellaini	(Belgium)	Etterbeek	22 November 1987	-	-	10	1	Standard Liège	1 September 2008	£15,000,000
26	Jack Rodwell	(England)	Southport	11 March 1991	5	-	-	-	N/A	1 July 2007	Trainee
27	Lukas Jutkiewicz	(Poland)	Southampton (England)	28 March 1989	-	-	-	-	Swindon Town	1 July 2007	£400,000
28	Victor Anichebe	(Nigeria)	Lagos	23 April 1988	44	11	4	1	N/A	1 July 2005	Trainee
30	John Ruddy	(England)	St. Ives	24 October 1986	1	-	-	-	Cambridge United	20 May 2005	£250,000
32	Dan Gosling	(England)	Brixham	2 February 1990	-	-	-	-	Plymouth Argyle	15 January 2008	£2,000,000
34	John Irving	(England)	Liverpool	17 September 1989	-	-	-	-	N/A	1 July 2007	Trainee
35	Kieran Agard	(England)	London	10 October 1989	-	-	-	-	N/A	1 August 2008	Trainee
36	John Paul Kissock	(England)	Liverpool	2 December 1989	-	-	-	-	N/A	1 July 2007	Trainee
37	Jose Baxter	(England)	Bootle	7 February 1992	-	-	-	-	N/A	1 August 2008	Trainee
38	James Wallace	(England)	Liverpool	19 December 1991	-	-	-	-	N/A	1 August 2008	Trainee

=== Player awards ===
- Player of the Season - Phil Jagielka
- Players' Player of the Season - Phil Jagielka
- Young Player of the Season - Marouane Fellaini
- Reserve / U21 Player of the Season - Kieran Agard
- Academy Player of the Season - James McCarten
- Goal of the Season - Dan Gosling vs. Liverpool

== Matches ==
=== Pre-season friendlies ===
12 July	Sion	1 – 0	Everton	Martigny
15:00	Crettenand 58'	Report		Stadium: Stade d'Octodure; Attendance: 2,500; Referee: M. Stuber

19 July	Cambridge United	4 – 2	Everton	Cambridge
15:00	Parkinson 1', 65'; Willmott 76'; Beesley 83'	Report	Jutkiewicz 20', 30'	Stadium: Abbey Stadium; Attendance: 4,295; Referee: Mike Thorpe

22 July	Preston North End	0 – 1	Everton	Preston
19:45		Report	Jagielka 6'	Stadium: Deepdale, Preston; Attendance: 10,322; Referee: Graham Salisbury

25 July	Nottingham Forest	1 – 1	Everton	Nottingham
19:45	Valente 58' (o.g.)	Report	Baxter 65'	Stadium: City Ground; Attendance: 15,488; Referee: Graham Salisbury

30 July	Chicago Fire	2 – 0	Everton	Bridgeview
19:30 CDT	Rolfe 41'; Frankowski 70'	Report		Stadium: Toyota Park; Attendance: 9,125; Referee: Landis Wiley

3 August	Colorado Rapids	1 – 2	Everton	Commerce City
18:00 MDT	Casey 48'	Report	Arteta 6'; Osman 87'	Stadium: Dick's Sporting Goods Park; Attendance: 10,278; Referee: Jeremy Vehar

9 August	Everton	1 – 1	PSV	Liverpool
17:15	Arteta 85' (pen.)	Report	Amrabat 6'	Stadium: Goodison Park; Attendance: 10,816; Referee: Chris Foy

=== Premier League ===
16 August	Everton	2 – 3	Blackburn Rovers	Liverpool
15:00	Arteta 45+2'; Yakubu 64'	Report	Dunn 22'; Santa Cruz 66'; Ooijer 90+4'	Stadium: Goodison Park; Attendance: 38,675; Referee: Andre Marriner

23 August	West Bromwich Albion	1 – 2	Everton	West Bromwich
15:00	Bednář 89' (pen.)	Report	Osman 65'; Yakubu 76'	Stadium: The Hawthorns; Attendance: 26,190; Referee: Rob Styles

30 August	Everton	0 – 3	Portsmouth	Liverpool
15:00		Report	Defoe 12', 69'; Johnson 40'	Stadium: Goodison Park; Attendance: 34,418; Referee: Mark Halsey

14 September	Stoke City	2 – 3	Everton	Stoke
13:30	Olofinjana 55'; Jagielka 63' (o.g.)	Report	Yakubu 41'; Anichebe 51'; Cahill 77'	Stadium: Britannia Stadium; Attendance: 27,415; Referee: Alan Wiley

21 September	Hull City	2 – 2	Everton	Hull
14:00	Turner 18'; Neville 50' (o.g.)	Report	Cahill 73'; Osman 78'	Stadium: KC Stadium; Attendance: 24,845; Referee: Lee Mason

27 September	Everton	0 – 2	Liverpool	Liverpool
12:45		Report	Torres 59', 62'	Stadium: Goodison Park; Attendance: 39,574; Referee: Mike Riley

5 October	Everton	2 – 2	Newcastle United	Liverpool
16:00	Arteta 17' (pen.); Fellaini 35'	Report	S. Taylor 45+2'; Duff 47'	Stadium: Goodison Park; Attendance: 33,805; Referee: Howard Webb

18 October	Arsenal	3 – 1	Everton	Holloway, London
15:00	Nasri 48'; Van Persie 70'; Walcott 90'	Report	Osman 9'	Stadium: Emirates Stadium; Attendance: 60,064; Referee: Peter Walton

25 October	Everton	1 – 1	Manchester United	Liverpool
12:00	Fellaini 63'	Report	Fletcher 22'	Stadium: Goodison Park; Attendance: 36,609; Referee: Alan Wiley

29 October	Bolton Wanderers	0 – 1	Everton	Bolton
20:00		Report	Fellaini 90'	Stadium: Reebok Stadium; Attendance: 21,692; Referee: Phil Dowd

1 November	Everton	1 – 0	Fulham	Liverpool
12:45	Saha 87'	Report		Stadium: Goodison Park; Attendance: 31,278; Referee: Lee Mason

8 November	West Ham United	1 – 3	Everton	Upton Park
15:00	Collison 63'	Report	Lescott 83'; Saha 85', 87'	Stadium: Upton Park, Essex; Attendance: 33,961; Referee: Mark Halsey

16 November	Everton	1 – 1	Middlesbrough	Liverpool
13:30	Yakubu 65'	Report	O'Neil 8'	Stadium: Goodison Park; Attendance: 31,063; Referee: Howard Webb

24 November	Wigan Athletic	1 – 0	Everton	Wigan
20:00	Camara 51'	Report		Stadium: JJB Stadium; Attendance: 18,344; Referee: Rob Styles

30 November	Tottenham Hotspur	0 – 1	Everton	Tottenham
15:00		Report	Pienaar 51'	Stadium: White Hart Lane; Attendance: 35,742; Referee: Steve Bennett

7 December	Everton	2 – 3	Aston Villa	Liverpool
16:00	Lescott 29', 90+3'	Report	Sidwell 1'; Young 54', 90+5'	Stadium: Goodison Park; Attendance: 31,922; Referee: Martin Atkinson

13 December	Manchester City	0 – 1	Everton	Manchester
15:00		Report	Cahill 90+2'	Stadium: City of Manchester Stadium; Attendance: 45,693; Referee: Mike Dean

22 December	Everton	0 – 0	Chelsea	Liverpool
20:00		Report	Terry (red card) 35'	Stadium: Goodison Park; Attendance: 35,655; Referee: Phil Dowd

26 December	Middlesbrough	0 – 1	Everton	Middlesbrough
15:00		Report	Cahill 51'	Stadium: Riverside Stadium; Attendance: 30,253; Referee: Mike Riley

28 December	Everton	3 – 0	Sunderland	Liverpool
14:00	Arteta 10', 27'; Gosling 83'	Report		Stadium: Goodison Park; Attendance: 39,146; Referee: Rob Styles

10 January	Everton	2 – 0	Hull City	Liverpool
15:00	Fellaini 18'; Arteta 45+1'	Report		Stadium: Goodison Park; Attendance: 37,727; Referee: Martin Atkinson

19 January	Liverpool	1 – 1	Everton	Anfield, Liverpool
20:00	Gerrard 68'	Report	Cahill 87'	Stadium: Anfield; Attendance: 44,382; Referee: Howard Webb

28 January	Everton	1 – 1	Arsenal	Liverpool
20:00	Cahill 61'	Report	Van Persie 90+3'	Stadium: Goodison Park; Attendance: 37,097; Referee: Andre Marriner

31 January	Manchester United	1 – 0	Everton	Manchester
20:00	Ronaldo 44' (pen.)	Report		Stadium: Old Trafford; Attendance: 75,399; Referee: Mark Halsey

7 February	Everton	3 – 0	Bolton Wanderers	Liverpool
15:00	Arteta 40' (pen.); Jô 49', 90+3' (pen.)	Report		Stadium: Goodison Park; Attendance: 33,791; Referee: Peter Walton

22 February	Newcastle United	0 – 0	Everton	Newcastle upon Tyne
16:00	Nolan (red card) 44'	Report		Stadium: St James' Park; Attendance: 47,683; Referee: Lee Mason

28 February	Everton	2 – 0	West Bromwich Albion	Liverpool
12:45	Cahill 36'; Saha 70'	Report		Stadium: Goodison Park; Attendance: 33,898; Referee: Steve Bennett

4 March	Blackburn Rovers	0 – 0	Everton	Blackburn
20:00		Report		Stadium: Ewood Park; Attendance: 21,445; Referee: Alan Wiley

14 March	Everton	3 – 1	Stoke City	Liverpool
15:00	Jô 18'; Lescott 24'; Fellaini 90+1'	Report	Shawcross 52'	Stadium: Goodison Park; Attendance: 36,396; Referee: Andre Marriner

21 March	Portsmouth	2 – 1	Everton	Portsmouth
12:45	Crouch 22', 75'	Report	Baines 4'	Stadium: Fratton Park; Attendance: 20,388; Referee: Peter Walton

5 April	Everton	4 – 0	Wigan Athletic	Liverpool
15:00	Jô 27', 51'; Fellaini 47'; Osman 61'	Report		Stadium: Goodison Park; Attendance: 34,427; Referee: Phil Dowd

12 April	Aston Villa	3 – 3	Everton	Aston, Birmingham
13:30	Carew 33'; Milner 55'; Barry 66' (pen.)	Report	Fellaini 19'; Cahill 23'; Pienaar 53'	Stadium: Villa Park, Attendance: 40,188; Referee: Howard Webb

22 April	Chelsea	0 – 0	Everton	Fulham
20:00		Report		Stadium: Stamford Bridge; Attendance: 41,556; Referee: Mark Halsey

25 April	Everton	1 – 2	Manchester City	Liverpool
15:00	Gosling 90+4'	Report	Robinho 35'; Ireland 54'	Stadium: Goodison Park; Attendance: 34,000; Referee: Alan Wiley

3 May	Sunderland	0 – 2	Everton	Sunderland
15:00		Report	Pienaar 48'; Fellaini 71'	Stadium: Stadium of Light; Attendance: 41,313; Referee: Martin Atkinson

9 May	Everton	0 – 0	Tottenham Hotspur	Liverpool
15:00		Report		Stadium: Goodison Park; Attendance: 36,646; Referee: Lee Mason

16 May	Everton	3 – 1	West Ham United	Liverpool
15:00	Saha 38', 76' (pen.); Yobo 48'	Report	Kováč 24'	Stadium: Goodison Park; Attendance: 38,501; Referee: Phil Dowd

24 May	Fulham	0 – 2	Everton	Fulham
16:00		Report	Osman 45', 88'	Stadium: Craven Cottage; Attendance: 25,497; Referee: Mike Riley

=== UEFA Cup ===
17 September First round, first leg	Everton (England)	2 – 2	(Belgium) Standard Liège	Liverpool
19:45	Yakubu 23'; Castillo 38'	Report	Mbokani 8'; Yobo 35' (o.g.)	Stadium: Goodison Park; Attendance: 28,312; Referee: (Poland) Gregorz Gilewski

2 October First round, second leg	Standard Liège (Belgium)	2 – 1 (4 – 3 agg.)	(England) Everton	Liège
20:00	Witsel 22'; Jovanović 79' (pen.)	Report	Jagielka 67'	Stadium: Stade Maurice Dufrasne; Attendance: 27,406; Referee: (Germany) Peter Sippel

=== League Cup ===
24 September Third round	Blackburn Rovers	1 – 0	Everton	Blackburn
19:45	Olsson 10'	Report		Stadium: Ewood Park; Attendance: 14,366; Referee: Martin Atkinson

=== FA Cup ===
3 January Third round	Macclesfield Town	0 – 1	Everton	Macclesfield
15:00		Report	Osman 43'	Stadium: Moss Rose; Attendance: 6,008; Referee: Peter Walton

25 January Fourth round	Liverpool	1 – 1	Everton	Anfield, Liverpool
16:00	Gerrard 54'	Report	Lescott 27'	Attendance: 43,524; Referee: Steve Bennett

4 February Fourth round replay	Everton	1 – 0 (a.e.t.)	Liverpool	Liverpool
20:00	Gosling 118'	Report	Lucas (red card) 76'	Stadium: Goodison Park; Attendance: 37,918; Referee: Alan Wiley

15 February Fifth round	Everton	3 – 1	Aston Villa	Liverpool
14:30	Rodwell 4'; Arteta 24' (pen.); Cahill 76'	Report	Milner 8' (pen.)	Stadium: Goodison Park; Attendance: 35,439; Referee: Martin Atkinson

8 March Quarter-final	Everton	2 – 1	Middlesbrough	Liverpool
16:00	Fellaini 50'; Saha 56'	Report	Wheater 44'	Stadium: Goodison Park; Attendance: 37,856; Referee: Mark Halsey

19 April Semi-final	Manchester United	0 – 0 (a.e.t.) (2 – 4 p)	Everton	Wembley, London
16:00 BST		Report		Stadium: Wembley Stadium; Attendance: 88,141; Referee: Mike Riley (West Yorkshire)
	Penalties
	Berbatov (penalty missed); Ferdinand (penalty missed); Vidić (penalty scored); Anderson (penalty scored)		(penalty missed) Cahill; (penalty scored) Baines; (penalty scored) Neville; (penalty scored) Vaughan; (penalty scored) Jagielka

30 May Final	Chelsea	2 – 1	Everton	Wembley, London
15:00	Drogba 21'; Lampard 72'	Report	Saha 1'	Stadium: Wembley Stadium; Attendance: 89,391; Referee: Howard Webb

== Season statistics ==
=== Starts and goals ===
No.	Pos	Nat	Player	Total		Premier League		FA Cup		League Cup		UEFA Cup	
No.	Pos	Nat	Player	Apps	Goals	Apps	Goals	Apps	Goals	Apps	Goals	Apps	Goals
1	GK	(England) ENG	Carlo Nash	0	0	0	0	0	0	0	0	0	0
2	DF	(England) ENG	Tony Hibbert	24	0	16+1	0	6	0	0	0	1	0
3	DF	(England) ENG	Leighton Baines	39	1	26+5	1	7	0	0	0	1	0
4	DF	(Nigeria) NGR	Joseph Yobo	33	1	26+1	1	2+1	0	1	0	1+1	0
5	DF	(England) ENG	Joleon Lescott	46	5	35+1	4	7	1	1	0	2	0
6	DF	(England) ENG	Phil Jagielka	43	1	33+1	0	6	0	1	0	2	1
7	MF	(Netherlands) NED	Andy van der Meyde	3	0	0+2	0	0+1	0	0	0	0	0
8	MF	(Ecuador) ECU	Segundo Castillo (on loan from Red Star Belgrade)	13	1	5+4	0	1+1	0	1	0	1	1
9	FW	(France) FRA	Louis Saha	29	8	10+14	6	2+1	2	1	0	1	0
10	MF	(Spain) ESP	Mikel Arteta	31	7	26	6	3	1	0	0	2	0
11	FW	(Brazil) BRA	Jô	12	5	11+1	5	0	0	0	0	0	0
12	GK	(Scotland) SCO	Iain Turner	0	0	0	0	0	0	0	0	0	0
14	FW	(England) ENG	James Vaughan	17	0	1+12	0	0+2	0	1	0	0+1	0
15	DF	(Denmark) DEN	Lars Jacobsen	6	0	4+1	0	0+1	0	0	0	0	0
17	MF	(Australia) AUS	Tim Cahill	40	9	28+2	8	7	1	0+1	0	2	0
18	DF	(England) ENG	Phil Neville	47	0	36+1	0	7	0	1	0	2	0
19	DF	(Portugal) POR	Nuno Valente	2	0	1+1	0	0	0	0	0	0	0
20	MF	(South Africa) RSA	Steven Pienaar	35	3	27+1	3	6	0	0	0	0+1	0
21	MF	(England) ENG	Leon Osman	43	7	32+2	6	6	1	1	0	2	0
22	FW	(Nigeria) NGR	Yakubu	17	5	14	4	0	0	0+1	0	2	1
24	GK	(United States) USA	Tim Howard	48	0	38	0	7	0	1	0	2	0
25	MF	(Belgium) BEL	Marouane Fellaini	35	9	28+2	8	4	1	1	0	0	0
26	DF	(England) ENG	Jack Rodwell	25	1	9+10	0	2+3	1	1	0	0	0
27	FW	(Poland) POL	Lukas Jutkiewicz	1	0	0+1	0	0	0	0	0	0	0
28	FW	(Nigeria) NGR	Victor Anichebe	22	1	5+12	1	3	0	0	0	1+1	0
30	GK	(England) ENG	John Ruddy	0	0	0	0	0	0	0	0	0	0
32	MF	(England) ENG	Dan Gosling	17	3	6+5	2	1+5	1	0	0	0	0
34	DF	(England) ENG	John Irving	0	0	0	0	0	0	0	0	0	0
35	FW	(England) ENG	Kieran Agard	0	0	0	0	0	0	0	0	0	0
36	MF	(England) ENG	John Paul Kissock	0	0	0	0	0	0	0	0	0	0
37	FW	(England) ENG	Jose Baxter	4	0	1+2	0	0	0	0+1	0	0	0
38	MF	(England) ENG	James Wallace	0	0	0	0	0	0	0	0	0	0

Notes:
- Appearances as subs are included.

=== Goalscorers ===
Name	Premier League	League Cup	FA Cup	UEFA Cup	Total
Tim Cahill	8	0	1	0	9
Marouane Fellaini	8	0	1	0	9
Louis Saha	6	0	2	0	8
Mikel Arteta	6	0	1	0	7
Leon Osman	6	0	1	0	7
Jô	5	0	0	0	5
Yakubu	4	0	0	1	5
Joleon Lescott	4	0	1	0	5
Steven Pienaar	3	0	0	0	3
Dan Gosling	2	0	1	0	3
Victor Anichebe	1	0	0	0	1
Leighton Baines	1	0	0	0	1
Segundo Castillo	0	0	0	1	1
Phil Jagielka	0	0	0	1	1
Joseph Yobo	1	0	0	0	1

=== Yellow cards ===
Name	Premier League	League Cup	FA Cup	UEFA Cup	Total
Marouane Fellaini	10	0	0	0	(yellow card) 10
Joseph Yobo	1	0	0	0	(yellow card) 1
Yakubu	1	0	0	0	(yellow card) 1
Leon Osman	1	0	0	0	(yellow card) 1
Leighton Baines	1	0	0	0	(yellow card) 1

== Transfers ==
=== Transfers in ===
Player	From	Date	Fee
(Denmark) Lars Jacobsen	(Germany) 1. FC Nürnberg	26 August 2008	Free
(France) Louis Saha	Manchester United	1 September 2008	Undisclosed
(England) Carlo Nash	Wigan Athletic	1 September 2008	Undisclosed
(Belgium) Marouane Fellaini	(Belgium) Standard Liège	1 September 2008	£15,000,000

=== Transfers out ===
Player	To	Date	Fee
(Scotland) Patrick Boyle	Released	1 May 2008	Free
(Iceland) Bjarni Viðarsson	(Netherlands) Twente	14 May 2008	Free
(Republic of Ireland) Lee Carsley	Birmingham City	3 June 2008	Free
(Germany) Stefan Wessels	(Germany) VfL Osnabrück	25 June 2008	Free
(Republic of Ireland) Darren Dennehy	(Wales) Cardiff City	28 June 2008	Free
(England) Jamie Jones	Leyton Orient	2 July 2008	Free
(Republic of Ireland) Aidan Downes	Yeovil Town	1 August 2008	Free
(England) Andrew Johnson	Fulham	7 August 2008	£10,500,000

=== Loans in ===
Player	From	Date From	Date Till
(Ecuador) Segundo Castillo	(Serbia) Red Star Belgrade	28 August 2008	30 May 2009
(Brazil) Jô	Manchester City	31 January 2009	1 June 2009

=== Loans out ===
Player	To	Date From	Date Till
