= 2012–13 Everton F.C. season =

English football club season

Everton
2012–13 season
- Chairman: Bill Kenwright
- Manager: David Moyes
- Stadium: Goodison Park (40,157)
- Premier League: 6th
- FA Cup: Sixth Round
- League Cup: Third Round
- Top goalscorer: League: Marouane Fellaini (11); All: Marouane Fellaini (12)
- Highest home attendance: 39,613 v. Liverpool (28 October 2012, Premier League)
- Lowest home attendance: 24,124 v. Leyton Orient (29 August 2012, League Cup)
- Average home league attendance: 36,356 (Premier League)
Home colours	Away colours	Third colours

The 2012–13 season was Everton's 21st season in the Premier League and 59th consecutive season in the top division of English football. It is also Everton's 114th season of league football and 116th season in all competitions. Having finished in seventh position in the domestic league in the previous season, Everton missed out on competing in any European competitions for the third season running.

The club entered the League Cup in the second round and were knocked out in the subsequent round following a 2–1 away defeat by Championship side Leeds United. Everton entered the FA Cup in the third round and progressed to the quarter-finals where they suffered a 3–0 loss at home to Premier League relegation candidates Wigan Athletic. Everton had a very consistent league campaign, never dropping below seventh place throughout the whole season. Highlights included a 1–0 win over Manchester United in the first game of the season, scoring two stoppage time goals to defeat Tottenham Hotspur 2–1 and a 2–0 home win over reigning Premier League champions Manchester City. However, too many draws and a lack of goals saw Everton's push for a European place fade and they finished sixth in the league. It did mean that the club finished above rivals Liverpool for the second successive season for the first time since 1937.

On 9 May, manager David Moyes announced he would be ending his 11-year tenure at the club when his contract expired at the end of the season, to become the new manager of Manchester United. Moyes transformed the club from struggling at the lower end of the league to regularly competing for the European places. He took charge of the team for over 500 games, including four European campaigns despite often working with a limited budget. Everton's average league position under his management was eighth and they never finished below this in each of his last seven seasons. However, he also received criticism for never winning a trophy during his time at the club.

== Season overview ==
=== June ===
On 1 June 2012, Everton's first pre-season friendly fixtures were announced: an away game against League Two side Morecambe acting as a testimonial to Morecambe's player-manager Jim Bentley, and a second away fixture against Scottish Premier League side Dundee United, and on 7 June 2012 a second match to be played in Scotland was announced, against Motherwell F.C. at their home ground Fir Park Stadium. A further three friendly fixtures were later determined: a home game against AEK Athens as a testimonial match for Everton's long-serving defender Tony Hibbert, and away matches against Blackpool and Spanish side Málaga, the latter serving as the 29th edition of the annual Trofeo Costa del Sol friendly competition. Everton was also initially scheduled to take part in the inaugural edition of the Java Cup, a four-team competition held in Indonesia, but later withdrew due to scheduling difficulties and security concerns.

=== July ===
On 4 July, Everton made their first move of the summer transfer window, bringing in former Rangers striker Steven Naismith, who had refused to sign a contract to move him from the old Rangers to the new company following their liquidation.

On 14 July, Everton won their first pre-season match against Morecambe at the Globe Arena on 14 July 2012, with a score of 4–1, with recent recruit Francisco Júnior scoring his first ever goal for the club.

On 26 July, Tim Cahill's eight-year stay at the club came to an end when he signed for the New York Red Bulls in a £1 million deal.

On 31 July, Steven Pienaar, who had made a significant impact during his loan spell at the end of last season, signed permanently for the club for £4.5 million and thus began his third stint at Everton.

=== August ===
On 6 August, Fenerbahçe completed a £2 million move for Joseph Yobo, who had not played for Everton since May 2010 due to two season-long loans at the Turkish side.

On 8 August, during his testimonial match against AEK Athens, Tony Hibbert (the player with the longest current spell without scoring a goal in English football) broke his goalscoring duck with a 25-yard free-kick, the last of Everton's goals in a 4–1 win. Hibbert is still yet to score a competitive goal in his career.

On 12 August, reigning Premier League champions Manchester City signed Jack Rodwell for £12 million, which could rise to £17 million depending on individual and team performances.

On 19 August, Belgium international Kevin Mirallas signed for the club from Greek champions Olympiacos for a £6 million fee.

On 20 August, Everton began their season with a 1–0 win over last year's runners-up Manchester United. Marouane Fellaini was the scorer, with a headed goal in the 57th minute. This was the first time in five years that Everton had won their opening league game.

On 25 August, Everton took their unbeaten run in the Premier League to 11 games following a 3–1 away victory against Aston Villa.

On 29 August, new signing Mirallas scored his first and second goals for the club during an emphatic 5–0 League Cup win over Leyton Orient to help Everton advance to the third round.

On 31 August, the final day of the summer transfer window, Everton signed versatile Costa Rican international Bryan Oviedo from Danish side Copenhagen for an undisclosed fee, believed to be £5 million.

=== September ===
On 1 September, Everton missed the chance to extend their unbeaten run in the league to 12 games when they lost 0–2 to West Bromwich Albion. If they had avoided defeat it would have been their longest spell without a loss since the title winning 1984–85 season.

On 22 September, Everton beat Swansea City 3–0 to move to second place in the league and ensure they have never lost a league encounter against the Welsh side.

On 25 September, Everton were knocked out of the League Cup following a 1–2 defeat by Championship side Leeds United in the third round at Elland Road.

On 29 September, Everton recorded their fourth win in the Premier League after they beat Southampton 3–1 at Goodison Park. The win saw them move up to second in the table.

=== October ===
On 9 October, David Moyes was named Premier League Manager of the Month for September.

On 19 October, Everton signed free agent Thomas Hitzlsperger until January on a short-term contract. The German international has 52 caps and had been without a club since leaving VfL Wolfsburg at the end of last season.

On 21 October, following the club's 1–1 draw with Queens Park Rangers, Everton had scored 15 goals from 8 games, their best ever scoring start to a Premier League season.

On 28 October, Everton faced Liverpool in the Merseyside Derby at Goodison Park. The game saw Everton grab a 2–2 draw after being two goals down.

=== November ===
On 3 November, the club drew 2–2 with Fulham at Craven Cottage. This meant Everton had drawn a game for the fourth successive time.

On 10 November, Everton ended a run of four successive draws with a 2–1 win over Sunderland to remain fourth in the table. It was the sixth game in a row where Everton had avoided defeat after going a goal down and stretched David Moyes' unbeaten run against Sunderland to 18 matches in his 400th Premier League game.

On 17 November, Everton lost to Reading. This was Everton's first league defeat in nine games.

On 24 November, Everton drew at home with Norwich City. Norwich's 90th-minute goal was the third time this season that Everton had conceded a last minute equaliser.

=== December ===
On 1 December, Everton drew 1–1 with title holders Manchester City at the Etihad Stadium. This result meant that Everton had been unbeaten in six out of the last seven meetings with City. The result also meant that Everton had drawn seven of their last nine games.

On 9 December, the club scored two stoppage time goals to beat Tottenham Hotspur 2–1. The first of these goals, a header from Steven Pienaar, was Everton's 1,000th in the Premier League.

On 11 December, Marouane Fellaini was named Premier League Player of the Month for November after scoring four goals in Everton's five games during the month.

On 15 December, Fellaini again made the headlines for allegedly headbutting Ryan Shawcross in Everton's 1–1 draw at Stoke City. Fellaini subsequently received a three-match ban for his actions. Stoke's goal was the 1,000th that Everton have conceded in the Premier League era.

On 22 December, Everton travelled to West Ham United and won 2–1. This game marked the first time that a Moyes' Everton side had recovered from a goal down at half-time to win away from home.

On 26 December, Everton defeated Wigan Athletic at Goodison Park 2–1. This result meant that Everton stretched their unbeaten run to seven league games. Wigan's consolation goal also meant that Everton had failed to keep a clean sheet in any of the previous 14 games they had played.

On 30 December, Everton lost to Chelsea at home, ending an unbeaten run at Goodison Park that stretched back to March.

=== January ===
On 2 January, Everton won 2–1 at Newcastle United, marking the first time in 21 months that they had won successive away games. The club scored and conceded for the 16th consecutive game which is a Premier League record.

On 7 January, Everton progressed to the fourth round of the FA Cup with a 5–1 away win at League Two side Cheltenham Town.

On 12 January, Everton drew 0–0 at home to Swansea, keeping their first clean sheet in 19 league and cup games, while they failed to score for the first time in the last 21 league and cup games.

On 28 January, the club won through to the fifth round of the FA Cup following a 2–1 away defeat of Championship side Bolton Wanderers.

On 30 January Everton defeated West Brom 2–1 at Goodison Park.

On 31 January, Everton made their only signing of the January transfer window, acquiring 18-year-old John Stones from Barnsley for a fee reported to be in the region of £3 million.

=== February ===
On 2 February, Everton rallied from a two-goal deficit to draw at home with relegation strugglers Aston Villa.

On 16 February, Everton conceded an injury time equaliser to Oldham Athletic in the fifth round of the FA Cup, forcing a replay at Goodison Park at the end of the month.

On 23 February, Everton conceded an injury time winner to Norwich to lose 2–1 at Carrow Road. The defeat meant that Everton lost for the second time in a row.

On 26 February, the club advanced to the quarter-finals of the FA Cup following a 3–1 victory over Oldham in the replay.

=== March ===
On 12 March, Everton begin the month with a 3–1 win over Reading.

On 9 March, Everton crashed out of the FA Cup with a 0–3 home defeat by Premier League relegation candidates Wigan, with all three goals coming in less than four first-half minutes.

On 16 March, Everton bounced back in the league to beat reigning champions Manchester City 2–0 at Goodison Park, despite playing with ten men from the 60th minute with the score at 1–0, when Steven Pienaar was dismissed. The win came on the day of Moyes' 11th anniversary with the club.

On 30 March, Everton defeated Stoke 1–0. It was Everton's third league win in a row.

=== April ===
On 5 April, Moyes was named Premier League Manager of the Month for March, the second time he has won the award this season and the tenth in total.

On 7 April, Everton drew 2–2 at Tottenham, ending a three-game winning streak.

On 13 April, Everton defeated relegation struggles Queens Park Rangers 2–0 at Goodison Park. The victory saw the Toffees unbeaten in the last five games.

On 16 April, Everton drew 0–0 at Arsenal, only the second time the club had avoided defeat at Arsenal in the last 16 years.

On 20 April, Everton suffered a 1–0 defeat at Sunderland, hampering their bid for European qualification.

On 27 April, Everton beat Fulham at home 1–0 in the league, meaning they have won all 20 league encounters at home against Fulham.

=== May ===
On 5 May, Everton drew 0–0 away at Liverpool.

On 9 May, the club confirmed that Moyes would be leaving Everton at the end of the season to join Manchester United as manager.

On 12 May, Everton won their final home game of the season against West Ham, 2–0, ensuring a second consecutive season of finishing above rivals Liverpool.

== Competitions ==
=== Preseason ===
14 July Jim Bentley Testimonial	Morecambe	1–4	Everton	Morecambe, England
14:00 BST	Bentley 90'	Report	Júnior 7'; Vellios 37'; Rodwell 41'; Anichebe 68'	Stadium: Globe Arena; Attendance: 4,223; Referee: Jeremy Simpson (England)

19 July	Dundee United (Scotland)	0–1	Everton	Dundee, Scotland
19:45 BST		Report	Barkley 87'	Stadium: Tannadice Park; Attendance: 6,537; Referee: William Collum (Scotland)

21 July	Motherwell (Scotland)	1–1	Everton	Motherwell, Scotland
13:30 BST	Law 54'	Report	Duffy 34'	Stadium: Fir Park; Attendance: 4,512; Referee: Stevie O'Reilly (Scotland)

5 August Keith Southern Testimonial	Blackpool	2–0	Everton	Blackpool, England
15:00 BST	Baptiste 63'; Caton 87'	Report		Stadium: Bloomfield Road; Attendance: 9,208; Referee: Graham Salisbury

8 August Tony Hibbert Testimonial	Everton	4–1	(Greece) AEK Athens	Liverpool, England
19:45 BST	Naismith 1', 17', 30'; Hibbert 53'	Report	Fountas 7'	Stadium: Goodison Park; Attendance: 17,508; Referee: Lee Mason

11 August Trofeo Costa del Sol	Málaga (Spain)	1–0	Everton	Málaga, Spain
20:00 BST	Weligton 74'	Report		Stadium: Estadio La Rosaleda; Attendance: 6,000; Referee: Perez Montero

=== Premier League ===
==== League table ====
Pos	Team	Pld	W	D	L	GF	GA	GD	Pts	Qualification or relegation
4	Arsenal	38	21	10	7	72	37	+35	73	Qualification for the Champions League play-off round
5	Tottenham Hotspur	38	21	9	8	66	46	+20	72	Qualification for the Europa League play-off round
6	Everton	38	16	15	7	55	40	+15	63	
7	Liverpool	38	16	13	9	71	43	+28	61	
8	West Bromwich Albion	38	14	7	17	53	57	−4	49	

Source: Barclays Premier League
Rules for classification: 1) Points; 2) Goal difference; 3) Goals scored; 4) Play-offs (only if needed to decide champion, teams for relegation or teams for UEFA competitions).

==== Results summary ====
Overall								Home						Away					
Pld	W	D	L	GF	GA	GD	Pts	W	D	L	GF	GA	GD	W	D	L	GF	GA	GD
38	16	15	7	55	40	+15	63	12	6	1	33	17	+16	4	9	6	22	23	−1

Last updated: 19 May.
Source: Everton Matches

==== Results by round ====
Round	1	2	3	4	5	6	7	8	9	10	11	12	13	14	15	16	17	18	19	20	21	22	23	24	25	26	27	28	29	30	31	32	33	34	35	36	37	38
Ground	H	A	A	H	A	H	A	A	H	A	H	A	H	H	A	H	A	A	H	H	A	H	A	H	H	A	A	H	H	H	A	H	A	A	H	A	H	A
Result	W	W	L	D	W	W	D	D	D	D	W	L	D	D	D	W	D	W	W	L	W	D	D	W	D	L	L	W	W	W	D	W	D	L	W	D	W	L
Position	7	3	6	7	2	2	3	4	5	4	4	5	5	6	6	4	4	4	4	6	5	5	5	5	5	6	7	6	5	6	6	6	6	6	6	6	6	6

Updated to match(es) played on 19 May. Source: Everton Matches
A = Away; H = Home; W = Win; D = Draw; L = Loss

==== Matches ====
20 August 2012 1	Everton	1–0	Manchester United	Liverpool, England
20:00 BST	Fellaini 57'; Gibson (yellow card) 90'	Report	Nani (yellow card) 3'; Scholes (yellow card) 13'	Stadium: Goodison Park; Attendance: 38,415; Referee: Andre Marriner

25 August 2012 2	Aston Villa	1–3	Everton	Birmingham, England
15:00 BST	Clark (red card) 58'; El Ahmadi 74', (yellow card) 82'	Report	Pienaar 3'; Fellaini 31'; Jelavić 43'	Stadium: Villa Park; Attendance: 36,565; Referee: Michael Oliver

1 September 2012 3	West Bromwich Albion	2–0	Everton	West Bromwich, England
15:00 BST	Reid (yellow card) 47'; Long 65'; McAuley 82'	Report	Hibbert (yellow card) 36'; Distin (yellow card) 66'; Neville (yellow card) 70'; Fellaini (yellow card) 71'	Stadium: The Hawthorns; Attendance: 25,383; Referee: Jonathan Moss

17 September 2012 4	Everton	2–2	Newcastle United	Liverpool, England
20:00 BST	Neville (yellow card) 6'; Baines 15'; Pienaar (yellow card) 78'; Fellaini (yellow card) 84'; Anichebe 88'	Report	Anita (yellow card) 29'; Perch (yellow card) 37'; Ba 49', 90'; Sh. Ameobi (yellow card) 85'	Stadium: Goodison Park; Attendance: 32,510; Referee: Mike Jones

22 September 2012 5	Swansea City	0–3	Everton	Swansea, Wales
13:45 BST	Williams (yellow card) 12'; Ki (yellow card) 31'; Dyer (yellow card) 55' (yellow-red card) 58'; Rangel (yellow card) 57'; Michu (yellow card) 65'	Report	Anichebe 22'; Mirallas 43'; Osman (yellow card) 71'; Fellaini 82'	Stadium: Liberty Stadium; Attendance: 20,464; Referee: Anthony Taylor

29 September 2012 6	Everton	3–1	Southampton	Liverpool, England
15:00 BST	Osman 25'; Jelavić 32', 38'	Report	Ramírez 6'	Stadium: Goodison Park; Attendance: 37,922; Referee: Lee Probert

6 October 2012 7	Wigan Athletic	2–2	Everton	Wigan, England
15:00 BST	Koné 10'; Maloney (yellow card) 19'; Di Santo 23'; McCarthy (yellow card) 56'	Report	Jelavić 11', (yellow card) 60'; Fellaini (yellow card) 44'; Baines (yellow card) 58', (goal) 87' (pen.); Neville (yellow card) 75'; Anichebe (yellow card) 90+2'	Stadium: DW Stadium; Attendance: 18,759; Referee: Kevin Friend

21 October 2012 8	Queens Park Rangers	1–1	Everton	London, England
16:00 BST	Baines 2' (o.g.); Diakité (yellow card) 67'; Granero (yellow card) 90+4'	Report	Júlio César 33' (o.g.); Pienaar (yellow card) 52' (yellow-red card) 61'	Stadium: Loftus Road; Attendance: 17,959; Referee: Jonathan Moss

28 October 2012 9	Everton	2–2	Liverpool	Liverpool, England
13:30 BST	Osman (yellow card) 20', (goal) 22'; Naismith 35'; Neville (yellow card) 45+2'; Jagielka (yellow card) 57'; Coleman (yellow card) 86'	Report	Baines 14' (o.g.); Suárez 20', (yellow card) 71'; Sterling (yellow card) 29'; Agger (yellow card) 69'	Stadium: Goodison Park; Attendance: 39,613; Referee: Andre Marriner

3 November 2012 10	Fulham	2–2	Everton	London, England
15:00 GMT	Howard 7' (o.g.); Riise (yellow card) 38'; Diarra (yellow card) 61'; Baird (yellow card) 75'; Sidwell 90'	Report	Fellaini 55', 72'; Osman (yellow card) 84'	Stadium: Craven Cottage; Attendance: 25,699; Referee: Neil Swarbrick

10 November 2012 11	Everton	2–1	Sunderland	Liverpool, England
15:00 GMT	Heitinga (yellow card) 58'; Fellaini 76'; Jelavić 79'	Report	Johnson 45+1'; Gardner (yellow card) 68'; Vaughan (yellow card) 90+3'; Rose (yellow card) 90+5'	Stadium: Goodison Park; Attendance: 35,999; Referee: Lee Mason

17 November 2012 12	Reading	2–1	Everton	Reading, England
15:00 GMT	Roberts (yellow card) 24'; Gorkšs (yellow card) 31'; Le Fondre 51', 79' (pen.); Hunt (yellow card) 89'	Report	Naismith 10'; Coleman (yellow card) 27'; Fellaini (yellow card) 79'	Stadium: Madejski Stadium; Attendance: 24,184; Referee: Martin Atkinson

24 November 2012 13	Everton	1–1	Norwich City	Liverpool, England
15:00 GMT	Naismith 12'; Heitinga (yellow card) 83'	Report	Johnson (yellow card) 68'; Garrido (yellow card) 87'; Tettey (yellow card) 88'; Bassong 90'	Stadium: Goodison Park; Attendance: 34,502; Referee: Mike Jones

28 November 2012 14	Everton	1–1	Arsenal	Liverpool, England
19:45 GMT	Fellaini 28'; Gibson (yellow card) 30'; Oviedo (yellow card) 70'	Report	Walcott 1'; Gibbs (yellow card) 21'	Stadium: Goodison Park; Attendance: 37,141; Referee: Michael Oliver

1 December 2012 15	Manchester City	1–1	Everton	Manchester, England
15:00 GMT	Tevez 43' (pen.); Lescott (yellow card) 45+2'; Zabaleta (yellow card) 89'	Report	Fellaini 33', (yellow card) 69'	Stadium: City of Manchester Stadium; Attendance: 47,386; Referee: Lee Probert

9 December 2012 16	Everton	2–1	Tottenham Hotspur	Liverpool, England
15:00 GMT	Baines (yellow card) 42'; Osman (yellow card) 70'; Pienaar 90'; Jelavić 90+2', (yellow card) 90+3'	Report	Defoe (yellow card) 35'; Vertonghen (yellow card) 37'; Dempsey 76'	Stadium: Goodison Park; Attendance: 36,494; Referee: Lee Mason

15 December 2012 17	Stoke City	1–1	Everton	Stoke-on-Trent, England
15:00 GMT	Jones 52'; Begović (yellow card) 72'	Report	Shawcross 36' (o.g.)	Stadium: Britannia Stadium; Attendance: 27,008; Referee: Mark Halsey

22 December 2012 18	West Ham United	1–2	Everton	London, England
15:00 GMT	Cole 14', (red card) 67'; Maïga (yellow card) 64'	Report	Anichebe 64'; Pienaar 73'; Gibson (red card) 90+2'	Stadium: Boleyn Ground; Attendance: 35,005; Referee: Anthony Taylor

26 December 2012 19	Everton	2–1	Wigan Athletic	Liverpool, England
15:00 GMT	Osman 52'; Jagielka 77'; Jelavić (yellow card) 89'	Report	Beausejour (yellow card) 58'; Koné 82'; Figueroa (yellow card) 89'	Stadium: Goodison Park; Attendance: 38,749; Referee: Lee Mason

30 December 2012 20	Everton	1–2	Chelsea	Liverpool, England
13:30 GMT	Pienaar 2', (yellow card) 64'; Distin (yellow card) 73'	Report	Lampard 42', 72'; Cahill (yellow card) 48'; David Luiz (yellow card) 70'; Cole (yellow card) 86'	Stadium: Goodison Park; Attendance: 39,485; Referee: Howard Webb

2 January 2013 21	Newcastle United	1–2	Everton	Newcastle upon Tyne, England
20:00 GMT	Cissé 2', (yellow card) 41'; Williamson (yellow card) 53'; Tioté (yellow card) 68'	Report	Baines 43'; Heitinga (yellow card) 47'; Anichebe 60'; Pienaar (yellow card) 80'	Stadium: St James' Park; Attendance: 49,391; Referee: Martin Atkinson

12 January 2013 22	Everton	0–0	Swansea City	Liverpool, England
15:00 GMT	Baines (yellow card) 81'	Report	Hernández (yellow card) 59'; Michu (yellow card) 62'; Vorm (yellow card) 88'; Tiendalli (yellow card) 90+1'	Stadium: Goodison Park; Attendance: 35,782; Referee: Phil Dowd

21 January 2013 23	Southampton	0–0	Everton	Southampton, England
20:00 GMT	Hooiveld (yellow card) 22'; Schneiderlin (yellow card) 39'	Report	Osman (yellow card) 52'	Stadium: St Mary's Stadium; Attendance: 28,359; Referee: Neil Swarbrick

30 January 2013 24	Everton	2–1	West Bromwich Albion	Liverpool, England
19:45 GMT	Baines 29', 45+2' (pen.)	Report	Yacob (yellow card) 61'; Long 65'; Dorrans (yellow card) 80'	Stadium: Goodison Park; Attendance: 31,376; Referee: Michael Oliver

2 February 2013 25	Everton	3–3	Aston Villa	Liverpool, England
15:00 GMT	Anichebe 21'; Fellaini 69', 90+3'; Osman (yellow card) 89'	Report	Benteke 2', 61', (yellow card) 45+1'; Agbonlahor 24' (yellow card) 88'; Lowton (yellow card) 64'; Sylla (yellow card) 90+6'	Stadium: Goodison Park; Attendance: 38,121; Referee: Mike Jones

10 February 2013 26	Manchester United	2–0	Everton	Manchester, England
16:00 GMT	Giggs 13'; Van Persie 45+1'	Report	Mirallas (yellow card) 38'; Fellaini (yellow card) 85'	Stadium: Old Trafford; Attendance: 75,525; Referee: Mark Halsey

23 February 2013 27	Norwich City	2–1	Everton	Norwich, England
15:00 GMT	Holt (yellow card) 54', (goal) 90+4'; Kamara 84'	Report	Osman 39'; Baines (yellow card) 43'	Stadium: Carrow Road; Attendance: 26,828; Referee: Lee Mason

2 March 2013 28	Everton	3–1	Reading	Liverpool, England
15:00 GMT	Fellaini 42'; Coleman (yellow card) 44'; Pienaar 59'; Mirallas 66'	Report	Le Fondre (yellow card) 2'; Robson-Kanu 84'	Stadium: Goodison Park; Attendance: 35,244; Referee: Anthony Taylor

16 March 2013 29	Everton	2–0	Manchester City	Liverpool, England
12:45 GMT	Fellaini (yellow card) 7'; Pienaar (yellow card) 26' (yellow-red card) 61'; Osman 32', (yellow card) 90+1'; Jelavić 90+3', (yellow card) 90+5'	Report	Kolarov (yellow card) 30'; Džeko (yellow card) 34'; Silva (yellow card) 45+2'	Stadium: Goodison Park; Attendance: 36,519; Referee: Lee Probert

30 March 2013 30	Everton	1–0	Stoke City	Liverpool, England
17:30 GMT	Mirallas 28'; Barkley (yellow card) 88'	Report	Whelan (yellow card) 45+1'; Shawcross (yellow card) 70'; Shotton (yellow card) 90+2'	Stadium: Goodison Park; Attendance: 33,977; Referee: Mike Jones

7 April 2013 31	Tottenham Hotspur	2–2	Everton	London, England
14:05 BST	Adebayor 1'; Dempsey (yellow card) 84'; Sigurðsson 87'	Report	Jagielka 15'; Mirallas 53', (yellow card) 82'	Stadium: White Hart Lane; Attendance: 36,192; Referee: Andre Marriner

13 April 2013 32	Everton	2–0	Queens Park Rangers	Liverpool, England
15:00 BST	Fellaini (yellow card) 35'; Gibson 40', (yellow card) 79'; Anichebe 56'; Pienaar (yellow card) 62'	Report	Bosingwa (yellow card) 34'; Granero (yellow card) 51'; Townsend (yellow card) 53'	Stadium: Goodison Park; Attendance: 34,876; Referee: Lee Mason

16 April 2013 33	Arsenal	0–0	Everton	London, England
19:45 BST	Arteta (yellow card) 56'; Monreal (yellow card) 90+4'	Report	Gibson (yellow card) 28'; Pienaar (yellow card) 35'; Barkley (yellow card) 70'	Stadium: Emirates Stadium; Attendance: 60,071; Referee: Neil Swarbrick

20 April 2013 34	Sunderland	1–0	Everton	Sunderland, England
15:00 BST	Sessègnon 45+1'; Mignolet (yellow card) 78'	Report	Heitinga (yellow card) 44'; Coleman (yellow card) 77'	Stadium: Stadium of Light; Attendance: 44,614; Referee: Phil Dowd

27 April 2013 35	Everton	1–0	Fulham	Liverpool, England
15:00 BST	Pienaar 16'; Osman (yellow card) 86'	Report	Enoh (yellow card) 30'; Emanuelson (yellow card) 71'; Manolev (yellow card) 90+4'	Stadium: Goodison Park; Attendance: 34,563; Referee: Jonathan Moss

5 May 2013 36	Liverpool	0–0	Everton	Liverpool, England
13:30 BST	Borini (yellow card) 88'	Report	Anichebe (yellow card) 56'; Osman (yellow card) 90+1'	Stadium: Anfield; Attendance: 44,941; Referee: Michael Oliver

12 May 2013 37	Everton	2–0	West Ham United	Liverpool, England
15:00 BST	Mirallas 6', 60', (yellow card) 62'	Report	Demel (yellow card) 38'; Collins (yellow card) 81'	Stadium: Goodison Park; Attendance: 39,475; Referee: Phil Dowd

19 May 2013 38	Chelsea	2–1	Everton	London, England
16:00 BST	Mata 7'; Torres (yellow card) 34', (goal) 76'; David Luiz (yellow card) 82'	Report	Naismith 14'; Fellaini (yellow card) 57'; Heitinga (yellow card) 70'	Stadium: Stamford Bridge; Attendance: 41,794; Referee: Anthony Taylor

=== League Cup ===
29 August 2012 Second round	Everton	5–0	Leyton Orient	Liverpool, England
19:45 BST	Mirallas 16', 29'; Osman 22'; Anichebe 35'; Gueye 67'	Report		Stadium: Goodison Park; Attendance: 24,124; Referee: Roger East

25 September 2012 Third round	Leeds United	2–1	Everton	Leeds, England
19:45 BST	White 4', (yellow card) 90+5'; Brown (yellow card) 62'; Austin 69'; Pearce (yellow card) 90+3'	Report	Oviedo (yellow card) 74'; Heitinga (yellow card) 78'; Distin 81'; Fellaini (yellow card) 90+3'	Stadium: Elland Road; Attendance: 21,164; Referee: Lee Mason

=== FA Cup ===
7 January 2013 Third round	Cheltenham Town	1–5	Everton	Cheltenham, England
19:45 GMT	Penn 51'	Report	Jelavić 12'; Baines 21' (pen.); Osman 49'; Coleman 58'; Fellaini 89'	Stadium: Whaddon Road; Attendance: 6,891; Referee: Kevin Friend

26 January 2013 Fourth round	Bolton Wanderers	1–2	Everton	Horwich, England
15:00 GMT	Sordell 27'; Spearing (yellow card) 86'	Report	Pienaar 18'; Fellaini (yellow card) 87'; Heitinga 90+1'	Stadium: Reebok Stadium; Attendance: 18,760; Referee: Martin Atkinson

16 February 2013 Fifth round	Oldham Athletic	2–2	Everton	Oldham, England
15:00 GMT	Obita 13'; Smith 90+5'	Report	Anichebe 24'; Jagielka 48'; Neville (yellow card) 55'	Stadium: Boundary Park; Attendance: 9,473; Referee: Phil Dowd

26 February 2013 Fifth round replay	Everton	3–1	Oldham Athletic	Liverpool, England
19:45 GMT	Mirallas 15'; Baines 34' (pen.); Osman 62'	Report	Smith 64'; Simpson (yellow card) 86'	Stadium: Goodison Park; Attendance: 32,688; Referee: Michael Oliver

9 March 2013 Sixth round	Everton	0–3	Wigan Athletic	Liverpool, England
12:45 GMT	Neville (yellow card) 39'; Osman (yellow card) 40'; Fellaini (yellow card) 57'; Gibson (yellow card) 87'	Report	Figueroa 30'; McManaman 31'; Gómez 33'; Maloney (yellow card) 49'	Stadium: Goodison Park; Attendance: 35,068; Referee: Kevin Friend

== Players ==
=== First-team squad ===
As of 2 February 2013.

Note: Flags indicate national team as defined under FIFA eligibility rules; some limited exceptions apply. Players may hold more than one non-FIFA nationality.

No.	Pos.	Nation	Player
1	GK	SVK	Ján Mucha
2	DF	ENG	Tony Hibbert
3	DF	ENG	Leighton Baines
4	MF	IRL	Darron Gibson
5	DF	NED	John Heitinga
6	DF	ENG	Phil Jagielka (vice-captain)
7	FW	CRO	Nikica Jelavić
8	MF	CRC	Bryan Oviedo
11	FW	BEL	Kevin Mirallas
14	FW	SCO	Steven Naismith
15	DF	FRA	Sylvain Distin
16	MF	GER	Thomas Hitzlsperger
18	DF	ENG	Phil Neville (captain)
20	MF	ENG	Ross Barkley

No.	Pos.	Nation	Player
21	MF	ENG	Leon Osman
22	MF	RSA	Steven Pienaar
23	DF	IRL	Séamus Coleman
24	GK	USA	Tim Howard
25	MF	BEL	Marouane Fellaini
26	DF	ENG	John Stones
27	FW	GRE	Apostolos Vellios
28	FW	NGR	Victor Anichebe
30	MF	POR	Francisco Júnior
31	FW	SCO	Matthew Kennedy
34	DF	IRL	Shane Duffy
42	DF	ENG	Luke Garbutt
43	FW	ENG	Conor McAleny

==== Out on loan ====
Note: Flags indicate national team as defined under FIFA eligibility rules; some limited exceptions apply. Players may hold more than one non-FIFA nationality.

No.	Pos.	Nation	Player
19	MF	SEN	Magaye Gueye (at Brest)

=== Reserve squad ===
As of 10 May 2013.

Note: Flags indicate national team as defined under FIFA eligibility rules; some limited exceptions apply. Players may hold more than one non-FIFA nationality.

No.	Pos.	Nation	Player
20	MF	ENG	Ross Barkley
30	MF	POR	Francisco Júnior
31	FW	SCO	Matthew Kennedy
34	DF	IRL	Shane Duffy
40	DF	ENG	Tyias Browning
42	DF	ENG	Luke Garbutt
43	FW	ENG	Conor McAleny
46	GK	ENG	Mason Springthorpe
—	MF	ENG	George Green

No.	Pos.	Nation	Player
—	DF	SWE	Johan Hammar
—	FW	ENG	Hallam Hope
—	MF	WAL	Gethin Jones
—	MF	IRL	Sam Kelly
—	FW	ENG	Chris Long
—	MF	ENG	John Lundstram
—	DF	IRL	Ben McLaughlin
—	GK	POL	Mateusz Taudul

==== Out on loan ====
Note: Flags indicate national team as defined under FIFA eligibility rules; some limited exceptions apply. Players may hold more than one non-FIFA nationality.

No.	Pos.	Nation	Player
41	DF	ENG	Jake Bidwell (at Brentford)

=== Player awards ===
- Player of the Season - Leighton Baines
- Players' Player of the Season - Leighton Baines
- Young Player of the Season - Ross Barkley
- Academy Player of the Season - Chris Long
- Goal of the Season - Kevin Mirallas vs Stoke City

== Statistics ==
=== Appearances ===
As of match played 19 May 2013

No.	Pos	Nat	Player	Total		Premier League		FA Cup		League Cup	
No.	Pos	Nat	Player	Apps	Goals	Apps	Goals	Apps	Goals	Apps	Goals
1	GK	(Slovakia) SVK	Ján Mucha	5	0	2	0	1	0	2	0
2	DF	(England) ENG	Tony Hibbert	6	0	4+2	0	0	0	0	0
3	DF	(England) ENG	Leighton Baines	44	7	38	5	5	2	1	0
4	MF	(Republic of Ireland) IRL	Darron Gibson	26	1	22+1	1	2+1	0	0	0
5	DF	(Netherlands) NED	John Heitinga	30	1	17+9	0	1+1	1	2	0
6	DF	(England) ENG	Phil Jagielka	41	3	36	2	4	1	1	0
7	FW	(Croatia) CRO	Nikica Jelavić	43	8	26+11	7	5	1	0+1	0
8	MF	(Costa Rica) CRC	Bryan Oviedo	18	0	1+14	0	1+1	0	1	0
11	FW	(Belgium) BEL	Kevin Mirallas	33	9	23+4	6	3+1	1	2	2
14	FW	(Scotland) SCO	Steven Naismith	35	4	13+18	4	0+2	0	2	0
15	DF	(France) FRA	Sylvain Distin	40	1	31+3	0	5	0	1	1
16	MF	(Germany) GER	Thomas Hitzlsperger	9	0	4+3	0	0+2	0	0	0
18	DF	(England) ENG	Phil Neville	25	0	18	0	5	0	1+1	0
19	FW	(Senegal) SEN	Magaye Gueye	6	1	0+2	0	0+2	0	2	1
20	MF	(England) ENG	Ross Barkley	9	0	2+5	0	0+1	0	0+1	0
21	MF	(England) ENG	Leon Osman	42	8	36	5	5	2	1	1
22	MF	(South Africa) RSA	Steven Pienaar	40	7	35	6	4	1	0+1	0
23	DF	(Republic of Ireland) IRL	Séamus Coleman	31	1	24+2	0	3	1	2	0
24	GK	(United States) USA	Tim Howard	40	0	36	0	4	0	0	0
25	MF	(Belgium) BEL	Marouane Fellaini	36	12	31	11	4	1	1	0
26	DF	(England) ENG	John Stones	0	0	0	0	0	0	0	0
27	FW	(Greece) GRE	Apostolos Vellios	6	0	0+6	0	0	0	0	0
28	FW	(Nigeria) NGR	Victor Anichebe	32	8	19+7	6	3+1	1	2	1
30	MF	(Portugal) POR	Francisco Júnior	1	0	0	0	0	0	1	0
31	FW	(Scotland) SCO	Matthew Kennedy	0	0	0	0	0	0	0	0
34	DF	(Republic of Ireland) IRL	Shane Duffy	3	0	0+1	0	0+1	0	0+1	0
42	DF	(England) ENG	Luke Garbutt	1	0	0	0	0	0	0+1	0
43	FW	(England) ENG	Conor McAleny	0	0	0	0	0	0	0	0

=== Goalscorers ===
As of match played 19 May 2013

R.	Name	Premier League	FA Cup	League Cup	Total
1	(Belgium) Marouane Fellaini	11	1	0	12
2	(Belgium) Kevin Mirallas	6	1	2	9
3	(Nigeria) Victor Anichebe	6	1	1	8
3	(Croatia) Nikica Jelavić	7	1	0	8
3	(England) Leon Osman	5	2	1	8
6	(England) Leighton Baines	5	2	0	7
6	(South Africa) Steven Pienaar	6	1	0	7
8	(Scotland) Steven Naismith	4	0	0	4
9	(England) Phil Jagielka	2	1	0	3
10	(Republic of Ireland) Séamus Coleman	0	1	0	1
10	(France) Sylvain Distin	0	0	1	1
10	(Republic of Ireland) Darron Gibson	1	0	0	1
10	(Senegal) Magaye Gueye	0	0	1	1
10	(Netherlands) John Heitinga	0	1	0	1
Own goals		2	0	0	2
Total		55	12	6	73

Source: Match reports in Results

=== Disciplinary record ===
R.	Name	Premier League			FA Cup			League Cup			Total		
R.	Name	Yellow card	(yellow card) (yellow-red card)	Red card	Yellow card	(yellow card) (yellow-red card)	Red card	Yellow card	(yellow card) (yellow-red card)	Red card	Yellow card	(yellow card) (yellow-red card)	Red card
1	(Belgium) Marouane Fellaini	9	0	0	2	0	0	1	0	0	12	0	0
2	(South Africa) Steven Pienaar	5	2	0	0	0	0	0	0	0	5	2	0
3	(England) Leon Osman	9	0	0	1	0	0	0	0	0	10	0	0
4	(Netherlands) John Heitinga	5	0	0	0	0	0	1	0	0	6	0	0
4	(England) Phil Neville	4	0	0	2	0	0	0	0	0	6	0	0
6	(Republic of Ireland) Darron Gibson (Note: Gibson received a red card in a Premier League match against West Ham United, however the card was later rescinded and Gibson did not serve any suspension.)	4	0	0	1	0	0	0	0	0	5	0	0
7	(England) Leighton Baines	4	0	0	0	0	0	0	0	0	4	0	0
7	(Republic of Ireland) Séamus Coleman	4	0	0	0	0	0	0	0	0	4	0	0
7	(Croatia) Nikica Jelavić	4	0	0	0	0	0	0	0	0	4	0	0
10	(Belgium) Kevin Mirallas	3	0	0	0	0	0	0	0	0	3	0	0
11	(Nigeria) Victor Anichebe	2	0	0	0	0	0	0	0	0	2	0	0
11	(England) Ross Barkley	2	0	0	0	0	0	0	0	0	2	0	0
11	(France) Sylvain Distin	2	0	0	0	0	0	0	0	0	2	0	0
11	(Costa Rica) Bryan Oviedo	1	0	0	0	0	0	1	0	0	2	0	0
15	(England) Tony Hibbert	1	0	0	0	0	0	0	0	0	1	0	0
15	(England) Phil Jagielka	1	0	0	0	0	0	0	0	0	1	0	0
Total		50	2	0	6	0	0	3	0	0	59	2	0

Last updated: match played 19 May 2013
Source: Match reports in Results

=== Home attendances ===
Correct as of match played 12 May 2013
Win Draw Loss

Comp	Date	Score	Opponent	Attendance
Premier League	20 August 2012	1–0	Manchester United	38,415
League Cup	29 August 2012	5–0	Leyton Orient	24,124
Premier League	17 September 2012	2–2	Newcastle United	32,510
Premier League	29 September 2012	3–1	Southampton	37,922
Premier League	28 October 2012	2–2	Liverpool	39,613
Premier League	10 November 2012	2–1	Sunderland	35,999
Premier League	24 November 2012	1–1	Norwich City	34,502
Premier League	28 November 2012	1–1	Arsenal	37,141
Premier League	9 December 2012	2–1	Tottenham Hotspur	36,494
Premier League	26 December 2012	2–1	Wigan Athletic	38,749
Premier League	30 December 2012	1–2	Chelsea	39,485
Premier League	12 January 2013	0–0	Swansea City	35,782
Premier League	30 January 2013	2–1	West Bromwich Albion	31,376
Premier League	2 February 2013	3–3	Aston Villa	38,121
FA Cup	26 February 2013	3–1	Oldham Athletic	32,688
Premier League	1 March 2013	3–1	Reading	35,244
FA Cup	9 March 2013	0–3	Wigan Athletic	35,068
Premier League	16 March 2013	2–0	Manchester City	36,519
Premier League	30 March 2013	1–0	Stoke City	33,977
Premier League	13 April 2013	2–0	Queens Park Rangers	34,876
Premier League	27 April 2013	1–0	Fulham	34,563
Premier League	12 May 2013	2–0	West Ham United	39,475
			Total attendance	782,643
			Total league attendance	690,763
			Average attendance	35,575
			Average league attendance	36,356

Source: Match reports in Results

== Transfers ==
=== Transfers in ===
Player	From	Date	Fee	Ref.
(Scotland) Steven Naismith	(Scotland) Rangers	4 July 2012	Tribunal	
(South Africa) Steven Pienaar	(England) Tottenham Hotspur	31 July 2012	£4.5M	
(Republic of Ireland) Ben McLaughlin	(Republic of Ireland) Dundalk	17 August 2012	Undisclosed	
(Belgium) Kevin Mirallas	(Greece) Olympiakos	19 August 2012	£6M	
(Costa Rica) Bryan Oviedo	(Denmark) Copenhagen	31 August 2012	Undisclosed (~£3M)	
(Scotland) Matthew Kennedy	(Scotland) Kilmarnock	31 August 2012	Nominal	
(Germany) Thomas Hitzlsperger	Unattached	19 October 2012	Free	
(England) John Stones	(England) Barnsley	31 January 2013	Undisclosed (~£3M)	

=== Transfers out ===
Player	To	Date	Fee	Ref.
(United States) Marcus Hahnemann	Unattached	18 May 2012	Free	
(Scotland) James McFadden	Unattached	18 May 2012	Free	
(England) Femi Orenuga	Unattached	18 May 2012	Free	
(Wales) Connor Roberts	Unattached	18 May 2012	Free	
(England) Adam Davies	Unattached	18 May 2012	Free	
(Democratic Republic of the Congo) Aristote Nsiala	(England) Accrington Stanley	18 May 2012	Free	
(England) Adam Forshaw	(England) Brentford	21 May 2012	Undisclosed	
(England) James Wallace	(England) Tranmere Rovers	26 June 2012	Undisclosed	
(England) Jose Baxter	Unattached	1 July 2012	Free	
(Portugal) João Silva	(Bulgaria) Levski Sofia	10 July 2012	Undisclosed (£0.3M)	
(Australia) Tim Cahill	(United States) New York Red Bulls	26 July 2012	£1M	
(Nigeria) Joseph Yobo	(Turkey) Fenerbahçe	6 August 2012	Undisclosed (~£2.5M)	
(England) Jack Rodwell	(England) Manchester City	12 August 2012	£12m	
(England) Anton Forrester	(England) Blackburn Rovers	30 January 2013	Free	

=== Loans out ===
Player	To	Date	Return date	Ref.
(England) Jake Bidwell	(England) Brentford	29 August 2012	End of season	
(England) Ross Barkley	(England) Sheffield Wednesday	14 September 2012	19 November 2012	
(England) Ross Barkley	(England) Leeds United	11 January 2013	13 February 2013	
(Senegal) Magaye Gueye	(France) Brest	31 January 2013	End of season	
(Sweden) Johan Hammar	(England) Stockport County	11 February 2013	12 March 2013	
(England) John Lundstram	(England) Doncaster Rovers	20 February 2013	28 April 2013	

== Awards ==
=== Player of the Month ===
Awarded by Everton F.C. to the best first team Everton player of the month.

Month	Pos.	Name	Ref.
September	DF	(England) Leighton Baines	
October	DF	(England) Phil Jagielka	
November	MF	(England) Leon Osman	
December	MF	(South Africa) Steven Pienaar	
January	GK	(United States) Tim Howard	
February	DF	(France) Sylvain Distin	
March	DF	(Republic of Ireland) Séamus Coleman	

=== Premier League Player of the Month ===
Month	Pos.	Name	Ref.
November	MF	(Belgium) Marouane Fellaini	

=== End-of-season awards ===
Award	Winner	Ref.
Player of the Season	(England) Leighton Baines	
Players' Player of the Season	(England) Leighton Baines	
Young Player of the Season	(England) Ross Barkley	
Academy Player of the Season	(England) Chris Long	
Goal of the Season	(Belgium) Kevin Mirallas vs. Stoke City	

=== PFA Premier League Team of the Year ===
Pos.	Name	Ref.
DF	(England) Leighton Baines	
