= Victor Anichebe =

Nigerian professional footballer (born 1988)

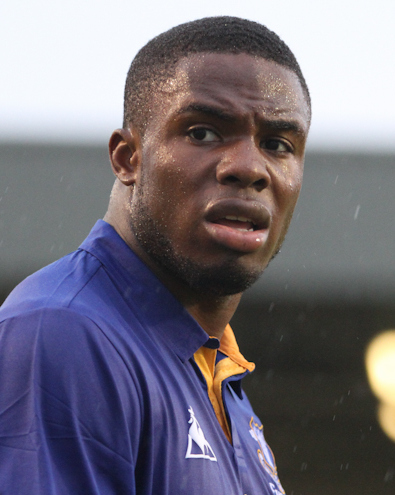
- Anichebe playing for Everton in 2011

Personal information
- Full name: Victor Chinedu Anichebe
- Date of birth: 23 April 1988 (age 38)
- Place of birth: Lagos, Nigeria
- Height: 1.91 m (6 ft 3 in)
- Position: Forward

Youth career
- 2003–2006: Everton

Senior career*
Years	Team	Apps	(Gls)
2006–2013	Everton	131	(18)
2013–2016	West Bromwich Albion	55	(6)
2016–2017	Sunderland	18	(3)
2017	Beijing Enterprises Group	11	(2)
Total		215	(29)

International career
2008	Nigeria U23	5	(2)
2008–2011	Nigeria	11	(1)
Medal record
Representing Nigeria
Men's Football
Silver medal – second place	2008 Beijing	Team competition
- * Club domestic league appearances and goals

Victor Chinedu Anichebe (born 23 April 1988) is a Nigerian former professional footballer who played as a forward.

== Early life ==
Anichebe was born in Lagos, Lagos State, Nigeria but moved to Liverpool, Merseyside, England, aged one. His family originally lived in Toxteth before settling in Crosby. He is the cousin of former professional football player Iffy Onuora, Olympian Anyika Onuora and professional basketball player Chiz Onuora. He is also an Olympic silver medallist, competing for Nigeria in the 2008 Olympics.

In March 2009, Anichebe received an apology from Cheshire Police when he was confronted for looking in a jeweller's window in Knutsford and his friend Lee Peltier of Liverpool handcuffed. Anichebe was on crutches due to injury at the time, and believed that the police took action because the pair are black.

== Club career ==
=== Everton ===
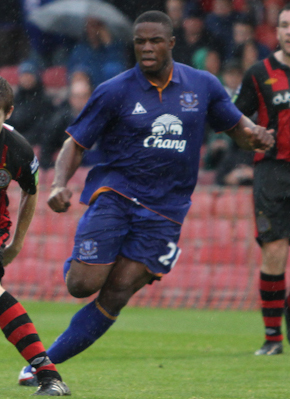
Anichebe playing for Everton in 2011

Anichebe made his reserve-team debut for Everton as a 15-year-old and his first-team debut less than two years later on 28 January 2006, as a substitute in the 89th minute of Everton's FA Cup fourth round tie against Chelsea, replacing Simon Davies. He signed his first professional contract with Everton, a two-year deal, in April 2006. On 7 May 2006, he scored his first Premier League goal, against West Bromwich Albion. He was awarded Everton's Reserve Player of the Season for the 2005–06 season.

Anichebe scored his first two Premier League goals of the 2006–07 campaign in a 3–0 win against Newcastle United on 30 December 2006. His contract was extended by four years towards the end of the season as Everton qualified for the UEFA Cup. In the UEFA Cup, Anichebe scored four times, against Metalist Kharkiv, AEL, 1. FC Nürnberg and Brann of Norway after coming on as a late second-half substitute in many of the matches. At the end of the season, he was voted by Everton fans as their Young Player of the Season.

On 22 February 2009, in a match against Newcastle United, a tackle from Kevin Nolan left Anichebe and unable to play for 11 months. Nolan, who received a straight red card for the foul, later settled out of court when Anichebe sued for loss of earnings. He returned to first team action in January 2010 in a 2–0 victory over Sunderland. His first goal on rejoining the squad came two months later in a 2–2 draw with Birmingham City. In January 2011, he signed a new four-and-a-half-year contract with Everton, along with teammate Séamus Coleman.

Anichebe suffered a groin injury while on international duty in September and did not play for the rest of 2011. He made his return as a second-half substitute on 1 January 2012, against West Bromwich Albion and scored in the 87th minute to give Everton a 1–0 away win. He continued his comeback by coming off the bench to score the equaliser in a 1–1 with Aston Villa on 14 January. Anichebe continued his goalscoring form by scoring his third goal of the season as a substitute in a 1–1 with Wigan Athletic on 4 February. His appearance also meant he became Everton's most used substitute in the history of the club, breaking Duncan Ferguson's old record of 82.

In his first Premier League start of the 2012–13 season, Anichebe scored the opening goal in a 3–0 win over Swansea City with a left-footed effort from close in. He then missed a number of games due to an hamstring injury, but returned in December to score a header to level the match against West Ham United at 1–1. Everton went on to win 2–1. He provided two assists during the festive season before scoring the winner against Newcastle United on 2 January 2013.

In February, Anichebe scored his first goal in the FA Cup of his Everton career against Oldham Athletic in a match which ended 2–2. In the second half of the season, he was used as Everton's main striker due to his impressive displays and the drop in form of Nikica Jelavić. In late March, Anichebe said he wanted to finish the season with a goal tally in double figures, but he finished with 8 goals from 32 matches, still the most he has scored in a single season in his career.

=== West Bromwich Albion ===
On 2 September 2013, Anichebe transferred to West Bromwich Albion in a deal which could rise to £6 million. On 2 February, Anichebe scored his second league goal against Liverpool to earn West Brom a point. On 11 February, he came on as a substitute and scored against Chelsea to earn West Brom a point.

On 18 May 2016, it was announced Anichebe and Stéphane Sessègnon would leave West Brom at the end of the 2015–16 season.

=== Sunderland ===
On 2 September 2016, Anichebe signed a one-year contract with Sunderland to play under manager David Moyes, the club's ninth signing of the summer. His first goal for the club came on 5 November 2016, when he scored in a 2–1 win against AFC Bournemouth, as Sunderland came from behind—with ten men—to secure their first win of the 2016–17 Premier League season. He followed that up in the next match, on 19 November 2016, when he scored two goals in a 3–0 home win against Hull City. His performances in November earned him a nomination for the PFA Fans Player of the Month award.

=== Beijing Enterprises Group ===
On 23 June 2017, Anichebe joined Chinese club Beijing Enterprises Group after he was released by Sunderland.

== International career ==
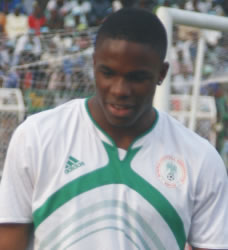
Anichebe playing for Nigeria in 2008

Anichebe made his debut for Nigeria on 26 March 2008 in an Olympic games qualifying match against South Africa. Anichebe came off the substitutes' bench to score the final goal in a 3–0 victory for Nigeria. He made his first start for Nigeria alongside fellow Everton player Yakubu in a friendly against Austria on 27 May 2008 being replaced at half-time.

Anichebe was selected to represent Nigeria at the 2008 Summer Olympics. On 10 August 2008, he scored Nigeria's second goal in their match against Japan. Nigeria eventually reached the final, which they lost 1–0 to Argentina, with Anichebe receiving a silver medal.

Anichebe was not selected on the final 23-man roster for the 2010 FIFA World Cup in South Africa despite a good performance during a friendly against Saudi Arabia. He scored his first senior team goal in the March 2011 friendly against Kenya. Anichebe suffered a groin injury during a 2012 African Cup of Nations qualifying match against Madagascar in September 2011, with Nigeria head coach Samson Siasia blaming the poor pitch. The Super Eagles won the match 2–0 but would miss out on qualification for the tournament one month later, with the injured Anichebe unable to take part in the deciding group match against Guinea.

In October 2012, Anichebe announced he was focusing on his form for club side Everton, rather than on earning a return to the Nigerian team. He was subsequently omitted from the squad for the 2013 Africa Cup of Nations, a tournament which Nigeria won. In May 2013, Anichebe temporarily retired from international football to concentrate on his club career. However, he said he would return to international football in the future.

== Career statistics ==
=== Club ===
Appearances and goals by club, season and competition
Club	Season	League			FA Cup		League Cup		Europe		Total	
Club	Season	Division	Apps	Goals	Apps	Goals	Apps	Goals	Apps	Goals	Apps	Goals
Everton	2005–06	Premier League	2	1	1	0	0	0	0	0	3	1
Everton	2006–07	Premier League	19	3	1	0	3	1	0	0	23	4
Everton	2007–08	Premier League	27	1	1	0	4	0	9	4	41	5
Everton	2008–09	Premier League	17	1	3	0	0	0	2	0	22	1
Everton	2009–10	Premier League	11	1	0	0	0	0	0	0	11	1
Everton	2010–11	Premier League	16	0	3	0	0	0	0	0	19	0
Everton	2011–12	Premier League	12	5	3	0	1	1	0	0	16	6
Everton	2012–13	Premier League	26	6	4	1	2	1	0	0	32	8
Everton	2013–14	Premier League	1	0	0	0	0	0	0	0	1	0
Everton	Total		131	18	16	1	10	3	11	4	168	26
West Bromwich Albion	2013–14	Premier League	24	3	0	0	0	0	0	0	24	3
West Bromwich Albion	2014–15	Premier League	21	3	2	3	2	0	0	0	23	6
West Bromwich Albion	2015–16	Premier League	10	0	3	0	1	0	0	0	14	0
West Bromwich Albion	Total		55	6	5	3	3	0	0	0	63	9
Sunderland	2016–17	Premier League	18	3	0	0	1	0	0	0	19	3
Beijing Enterprises Group	2017	China League One	11	2	0	0	0	0	0	0	11	2
Career total			215	29	21	4	14	3	11	4	261	40

=== International ===
Appearances and goals by national team and year
National team	Year	Apps	Goals
Nigeria	2008	4	0
Nigeria	2010	1	0
Nigeria	2011	6	1
Total		11	1

Scores and results list Nigeria's goal tally first, score column indicates score after each Anichebe goal.

List of international goals scored by Victor Anichebe
No.	Date	Venue	Cap	Opponent	Score	Result	Competition
1	29 March 2011	National Stadium, Abuja, Nigeria	7	Kenya	2–0	3–0	Friendly
