= Darron Gibson =

Irish footballer (born 1987)

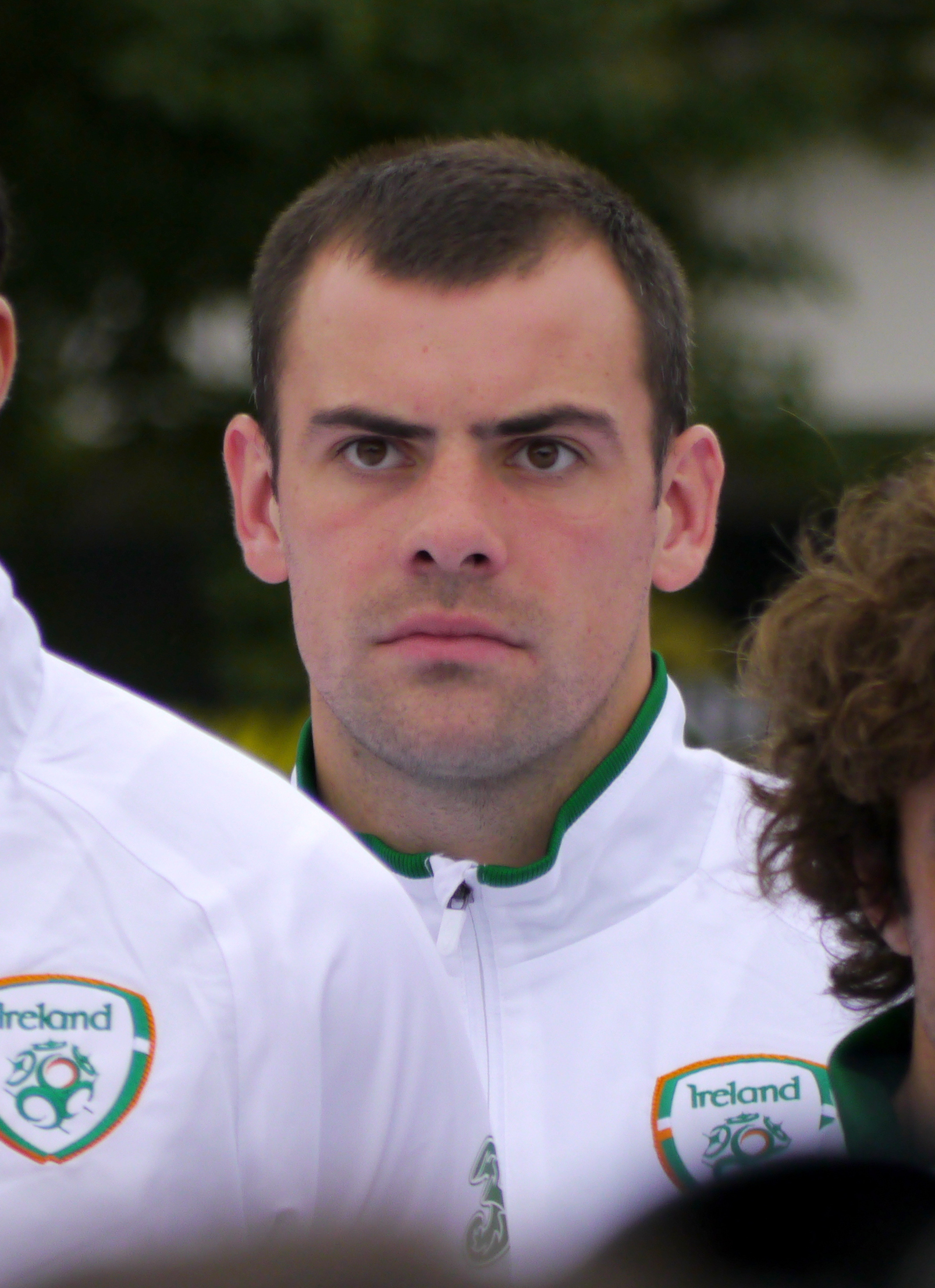
- Gibson lining up for the Republic of Ireland in 2012

Personal information
- Full name: Darron Thomas Daniel Gibson
- Date of birth: 25 October 1987 (age 39)
- Place of birth: Derry, Northern Ireland
- Height: 6 ft 0 in (1.83 m)
- Position: Midfielder

Youth career
- 2003–2004: Institute
- 2004–2005: Manchester United

Senior career*
Years	Team	Apps	(Gls)
2005–2012	Manchester United	31	(3)
2006–2007	→ Royal Antwerp (loan)	25	(1)
2007–2008	→ Wolverhampton Wanderers (loan)	21	(1)
2012–2017	Everton	51	(2)
2017–2018	Sunderland	27	(0)
2018–2019	Wigan Athletic	18	(0)
2020	Salford City	3	(0)
2020–2021	Salford City	4	(0)
Total		180	(7)

International career
2003	Republic of Ireland U17	3	(0)
2005	Republic of Ireland U19	9	(1)
2007–2008	Republic of Ireland U21	2	(0)
2006	Republic of Ireland B	1	(0)
2007–2016	Republic of Ireland	27	(1)
- * Club domestic league appearances and goals

Darron Thomas Daniel Gibson (born 25 October 1987) is an Irish former professional footballer who played as a midfielder. He played for the Republic of Ireland national team.

Born in Derry, Northern Ireland, he began his club career with Institute before joining Manchester United, for whom he made his professional debut in 2005. After loans with Belgium's Royal Antwerp and the Championship's Wolverhampton Wanderers, he spent several seasons as part of the Manchester United team, where he scored 10 goals in 60 games and won a Premier League title, two League Cups and a FIFA Club World Cup. In January 2012, Gibson joined Everton for an undisclosed fee, where his appearances were limited from 2013 due to injury. He signed for Sunderland in January 2017, and left by mutual consent in March 2018. At the end of his professional career, he had spells with Wigan Athletic and Salford City.

In 2007, Gibson was at the centre of a dispute between the Football Association of Ireland (FAI) and the Irish Football Association (IFA), after he opted to play for the Republic of Ireland instead of Northern Ireland. The issue was referred to FIFA and was discussed in the Northern Ireland Assembly. The issue was settled in 2010 when it was declared that Northern Ireland-born people are entitled to play for either the Republic or Northern Ireland. Gibson represented the Republic of Ireland at UEFA Euro 2012.

== Club career ==
=== Manchester United ===
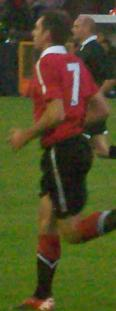
Gibson playing for Manchester United Reserves in 2010

Gibson was born in Derry, Northern Ireland. A former pupil of St Columb's College, he played junior football in the Derry and District League, and then with Institute before joining Manchester United in 2004. He made his senior debut for United on 26 October 2005 in a League Cup match against Barnet, coming on as a substitute for Lee Martin. During the 2005–06 season he played regularly for Manchester United Reserves, helping them win a treble. He made 19 appearances, scoring twice. In May 2006, he won the prestigious Jimmy Murphy Award as United's youth player of the year and then played regularly for the United senior team during their pre-season summer matches, together with Dong Fangzhuo, Jonny Evans, Fraizer Campbell and Danny Simpson.

Gibson was one of several United players who spent the 2006–07 season on loan at Royal Antwerp. In October 2007, he was loaned out again, this time to Wolverhampton Wanderers, where he spent the majority of the 2007–08 season. At Wolves he scored once, against Burnley on 8 December 2007.

Gibson made his Premier League debut on 15 November 2008, appearing as a second-half substitute against Stoke City, before making his UEFA Champions League debut ten days later, coming on as a substitute for Darren Fletcher against Villarreal on 25 November 2008. In December 2008, he travelled with the United squad to the 2008 FIFA Club World Cup in Japan, where, despite not making any appearances, he picked up a winners' medal. On 4 January 2009, Gibson scored his first goal for the club, United's third in a 3–0 victory over Southampton in the FA Cup third round. On 1 March 2009, Gibson started in the centre of midfield alongside Paul Scholes against Tottenham Hotspur in the 2009 League Cup Final at Wembley Stadium, playing the full initial 90 minutes before being replaced by Ryan Giggs at the start of extra time as Manchester United went on to win 4–1 on penalties. On 24 May, he scored his first league goal for Manchester United in the last match of the 2008–09 Premier League season against Hull City. Gibson was rewarded with a three-year extension to his Manchester United contract, tying him to the club until at least 2012.

Gibson was one of a number of young United players who came under criticism when they lost a four-year unbeaten home record in Europe, losing 1–0 to Beşiktaş at Old Trafford. On 1 December 2009, six days on from the defeat in the Champions League, Gibson responded to the criticism by scoring both of United's goals in a 2–0 win against Tottenham to send United through the semi-finals of the League Cup. Gibson was granted a starting place in the Champions League second leg quarter-final tie against Bayern Munich and scored a long-range shot after only three minutes, his first goal in a UEFA competition, but despite winning the match 3–2, they were knocked out by Bayern on away goals with the aggregate score ending 4–4.

He scored his first goal of the 2010–11 season as he netted the first of United's goals in a 5–2 away win over Scunthorpe United in the League Cup. In February 2011, Gibson's national team manager, Giovanni Trapattoni, told him that he must leave Manchester United in order to further his career. Gibson scored in the second leg of the Champions League semi-final as United beat Schalke 4–1 (6–1 on aggregate) but he was one of a number of players from that match alongside Rafael, Evans, O'Shea and Berbatov who could not make the substitutes bench for the Champions League final, which United lost 3–1 to Barcelona. Sunderland agreed a transfer fee with United to sign Gibson in the summer of 2011, but Gibson could not agree personal terms. He subsequently only made two appearances for the club in the 2011–12 season, despite there being a number of midfielders out injured at Old Trafford, and left the club in January 2012.

=== Everton ===
On 13 January 2012, Gibson signed for Everton for an undisclosed fee. He became the fourth ex-United player to sign for Everton under David Moyes, following Phil Neville, Tim Howard and Louis Saha. He made his debut a day later, as he started in a 1–1 draw with Aston Villa. Later that month, Gibson scored his first goal for the club in a 1–0 home win against league leaders Manchester City. Gibson played 11 times in the league during his first season with the club and did not finish on the losing side once. If his time at Manchester United is taken into account this figure is stretched to 28 consecutive league matches without defeat.

The run came to an end in Everton's third league match of the 2012–13 season, when Gibson started in a 0–2 loss to West Bromwich Albion, although the match was level at 0–0 when Gibson was substituted in the first half due to injury. Gibson was sent off for the first time in his career, in a 2–1 win away to West Ham United on 22 December 2012, although the red card and subsequent ban were rescinded by The Football Association five days later. On 13 April 2013, Gibson scored his first goal of the season in a 2–0 home win against Queens Park Rangers. His impact on Everton in his first two seasons was such that the club won 52% of the matches he played in and only 25% of those he did not, with Gibson being hailed as the key link between attack and defence with a number of eye-catching performances notably against Tottenham, Manchester City and his former club Manchester United.

Gibson only made one league appearance during the 2013–14 season as it was ended in October when he suffered serious cruciate knee ligament damage whilst on international duty.

On 8 November 2016, Gibson captained Everton's under-23 team in their elimination from the EFL Trophy by Blackpool.

=== Sunderland ===
Gibson signed for Sunderland, along with former Everton teammate Bryan Oviedo, in January 2017. He signed an 18-month deal for an undisclosed fee. He made his debut on 4 February as a 52nd-minute substitute for Jack Rodwell in a 4–0 win at Crystal Palace, and totalled 12 appearances as the Black Cats suffered relegation to the Championship.

After being charged with driving with excess alcohol in March 2018 Gibson was suspended by the club, before leaving by mutual consent less than a fortnight later.

=== Wigan Athletic ===
On 3 August 2018, Wigan Athletic signed Gibson on a free transfer. He made his debut a day later, featuring in a 3–2 victory over Sheffield Wednesday. On 6 October, he was sent off in a 4–0 loss at Preston North End for a foul on Ben Pearson. He was released by Wigan at the end of the 2018–19 season.

=== Salford City ===
Gibson signed a six-month contract with Salford City on 6 February 2020. He made his debut for the club on 19 February in a Football League Trophy semi-final victory over Newport County, playing the full match and scoring one of the penalties in the shoot-out. He was released by Salford on 17 May 2020 following the coronavirus enforced decision to end the League Two season, but subsequently rejoined the club ahead of the 2020–21 season; upon signing for the club for a second spell, his manager Graham Alexander said he was "delighted". On 17 October, Gibson suffered a broken leg in a match against Port Vale. At the end of the 2020–21 season, it was announced that he would be leaving the club.

== International career ==
Gibson was at the centre of a dispute between the Irish Football Association (IFA) and the Football Association of Ireland (FAI) over the eligibility of players born within Northern Ireland to represent the Republic of Ireland. The general principle or article 5 of FIFA's Regulations Governing the Application of the Statutes states that "any person holding a permanent nationality that is not dependent on residence in a certain country is eligible to play for the representative teams of the Association of that country". Due to the constitutional position of Northern Ireland following the signing of the Good Friday Agreement, citizenship of the Republic of Ireland is the undisputed birthright of every person born on the island of Ireland if they so wish, so long as at least one parent is an Irish or British citizen or, failing that, a permanent resident. As a result, Gibson was approached to represent both Northern Ireland and the Republic of Ireland at international level.

=== Northern Ireland ===
Gibson initially represented Northern Ireland at Under-16 level and was included in Victory Shield squads. However, he was dropped from the team after attending trials with Manchester United and subsequently switched allegiance to the Republic of Ireland. Before Gibson made his senior international debut for the Republic of Ireland, Nigel Worthington, the Northern Ireland manager, made an unsuccessful attempt to persuade him to switch his allegiance back.

=== Republic of Ireland ===
Gibson first represented the Republic of Ireland at under-17 level. Then during the 2005–06 season he captained both the Republic of Ireland under-19 and under-21 squads. On 14 November 2006, he also played for Republic of Ireland B in a 0–0 draw against Scotland B. In 2007, Gibson was included in several senior Republic of Ireland squads for Euro 2008 qualifiers, before he eventually made his debut in a 4–0 win against Denmark. During the away friendly, he came on as half-time substitute, replacing Andy Reid. In the 54th minute, Gibson fired a shot from outside the penalty area that the Danish keeper, Jesper Christiansen, could only palm away, allowing Shane Long to follow up and score the Republic's third goal. Gibson won his second full cap on 8 September 2007 in an away match against Slovakia. The Euro 2008 qualifier, which finished as a 2–2 draw, saw him again used as substitute, this time replacing Aiden McGeady after 61 minutes.

Gibson made his first start for the Republic of Ireland national team in a 1–0 win at home to Cyprus on 15 October 2008. After Steven Reid dropped out of the Irish squad due to injury, Gibson was called up to provide extra physicality in the centre of the Irish midfield. Manager Giovanni Trapattoni also cited Gibson's confidence on the football pitch as the reason for choosing him ahead of Liam Miller and Andy Reid. On 8 February 2011, Gibson scored his first and only goal for his country, a shot from long range in a 3–0 victory over Wales in the first match of the 2011 Nations Cup.

Gibson was selected in the Ireland squad for UEFA Euro 2012. However, he was an unused substitute for all of Ireland's matches as the team was knocked out in the group stage with three successive defeats.

On 1 September 2012, Gibson was included in Ireland's squad to play Kazakhstan in a 2014 World Cup qualifier. However, he withdrew from the squad citing disappointment at his lack of playing time during Euro 2012. On 8 March 2013, he again turned down a call up for Ireland's World Cup qualifiers against Sweden and Austria.

On 30 September 2013, Gibson was recalled to the Republic of Ireland squad for the World Cup qualifiers against Germany and Kazakhstan by interim manager Noel King. After starting the 3–0 defeat to Germany he was stretchered off with a suspected knee injury in the next match against Kazakhstan which ruled him out for the rest of the season.

On 3 September 2014, Gibson made a start for the Republic of Ireland after recovering from his long term knee injury when his team beat Oman 2–0. On 11 October, he made his first competitive appearance for Ireland in more than a year, playing the full 90 minutes in the team's 7–0 UEFA Euro 2016 qualification defeat of Gibraltar.

== Personal life ==
In August 2015, Gibson was charged with driving without due care and attention, driving with excess alcohol and failing to stop after a road traffic collision in Altrincham, Greater Manchester. In September 2015 he admitted to drink driving, careless driving and failing to stop at the scene of an accident and was sentenced to a 12-month community order and banned from driving for 20 months. In March 2018, Sunderland suspended Gibson after he was arrested on suspicion of driving over the legal alcohol limit, he was given a two-year community order and was banned from driving for 40 months, two months later after pleading guilty in court and admitting he had turned to alcohol to help with dealing with the constant pain from trying to manage injuries and being away from family. The sentence was later reduced to a 27 month ban on appeal.

== Career statistics ==
=== Club ===
As of match played 19 December 2020

Appearances and goals by club, season and competition
Club	Season	League			National Cup		League Cup		Europe		Other		Total	
Club	Season	Division	Apps	Goals	Apps	Goals	Apps	Goals	Apps	Goals	Apps	Goals	Apps	Goals
Manchester United	2005–06	Premier League	0	0	0	0	1	0	0	0	—		1	0
Manchester United	2006–07	Premier League	0	0	—		—		0	0	—		0	0
Manchester United	2007–08	Premier League	0	0	—		0	0	0	0	0	0	0	0
Manchester United	2008–09	Premier League	3	1	3	2	6	0	2 (Note: Appearances in UEFA Champions League)	0	0	0	14	3
Manchester United	2009–10	Premier League	15	2	1	0	3	2	4	1	0	0	23	5
Manchester United	2010–11	Premier League	12	0	3	0	2	1	3	1	0	0	20	2
Manchester United	2011–12	Premier League	1	0	0	0	1	0	0	0	0	0	2	0
Manchester United	Total		31	3	7	2	13	3	9	2	0	0	60	10
Royal Antwerp (loan)	2006–07	Belgian Second Division	25	1	2	0	—		—		6 (Note: Appearances in Belgian Second Division play-offs)	0	33	1
Wolverhampton Wanderers (loan)	2007–08	Championship	21	1	3	0	—		—		—		24	1
Everton	2011–12	Premier League	11	1	4	0	—		—		—		15	1
Everton	2012–13	Premier League	23	1	3	0	0	0	—		—		26	1
Everton	2013–14	Premier League	1	0	0	0	1	0	—		—		2	0
Everton	2014–15	Premier League	9	0	0	0	1	0	4 (Note: Appearances in UEFA Europa League)	0	—		14	0
Everton	2015–16	Premier League	7	0	3	0	1	0	—		—		11	0
Everton	2016–17	Premier League	0	0	0	0	1	0	—		—		1	0
Everton	Total		51	2	10	0	4	0	4	0	—		69	2
Everton U23	2016–17	—			—		—		—		1 (Note: Appearances in EFL Trophy)	0	1	0
Sunderland	2016–17	Premier League	12	0	0	0	—		—		—		12	0
Sunderland	2017–18	Championship	15	0	0	0	3	0	—		—		18	0
Sunderland	Total		27	0	0	0	3	0	—		—		30	0
Wigan Athletic	2018–19	Championship	18	0	0	0	0	0	—		0	0	18	0
Salford City	2019–20	League Two	3	0	—		—		—		1 (Note: Appearances in EFL Trophy)	0	4	0
Salford City	2020–21	League Two	4	0	0	0	2	0	—		0 (Note: Appearances in EFL Trophy)	0	6	0
Salford City	Total		7	0	0	0	2	0	0	0	1	0	10	0
Career total			180	7	22	2	22	3	13	2	8	0	245	14

=== International ===
As of match played 31 May 2016

Appearances and goals by national team and year
National team	Year	Apps	Goals
Republic of Ireland	2007	2	0
Republic of Ireland	2008	2	0
Republic of Ireland	2009	4	0
Republic of Ireland	2010	5	0
Republic of Ireland	2011	4	1
Republic of Ireland	2012	2	0
Republic of Ireland	2013	2	0
Republic of Ireland	2014	4	0
Republic of Ireland	2016	2	0
Total		27	1

=== International goals ===
As of match played 31 May 2016. Republic of Ireland score listed first, score column indicates score after each Gibson goal.

International goals by date, venue, cap, opponent, score, result and competition
No.	Date	Venue	Cap	Opponent	Score	Result	Competition	Ref
1	8 February 2011	Aviva Stadium, Dublin, Ireland	14	Wales	1–0	3–0	2011 Nations Cup	

== Honours ==
Manchester United

- Premier League: 2010–11
- Football League Cup: 2008–09, 2009–10
- FIFA Club World Cup: 2008

Republic of Ireland

- Nations Cup: 2011

Individual

- Jimmy Murphy Young Player of the Year: 2005–06
- FAI Young International Player of the Year: 2009
- FAI International Goal of the Year: 2011 vs. Wales

== See also ==
- List of Republic of Ireland international footballers born outside the Republic of Ireland
