= Tony Hibbert =

English footballer (born 1981)

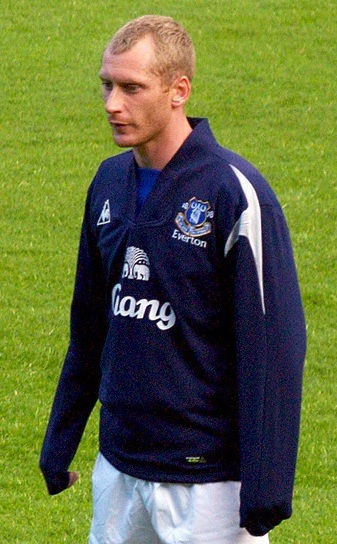
- Hibbert training with Everton in 2009

Personal information
- Full name: Anthony James Hibbert
- Date of birth: 20 February 1981 (age 45)
- Place of birth: Liverpool, England
- Height: 1.73 m (5 ft 8 in)
- Position: Right-back

Youth career
- 1991–1999: Everton

Senior career*
Years	Team	Apps	(Gls)
1999–2016	Everton	265	(0)
- * Club domestic league appearances and goals

Anthony James Hibbert (born 20 February 1981) is an English former professional footballer. A one-club man for his entire career, coupled with his down-to-earth demeanour, Hibbert earned a cult hero status among Everton fans.

Originally a midfielder, Hibbert converted to play at right-back. He spent his entire professional career with Everton, having joined the club in 1991. He made his senior debut for Everton in 2001, and went on to make 328 appearances for the club in all competitions.

== Club career ==
Hibbert was born in Liverpool and brought up in Huyton. Growing up as an Everton supporter, Hibbert joined the club as a boy. He was a member of the Everton youth team that won the FA Youth Cup in 1998 beating Blackburn Rovers 5–3 on aggregate. Three years later, he made his first-team debut for the club in a Premier League match against West Ham United on 31 March 2001, in which a high challenge from Stuart Pearce into Hibbert's chest saw Everton earn a penalty.

In the 2002–03 season, in the wake of an injury to fellow right-back Steve Watson, Hibbert became a regular member of the Everton first team. The Actim Index rated him the best English right-back in the 2004–05 season.

He missed the end of the 2005–06 season with a hernia problem and his preparations for the 2006–07 season were hampered after he was infected by cryptosporidium parasite. Hibbert's 2006–07 season was seriously disrupted by injury. He again played regularly in the 2007–08 and the 2008–09 seasons.

At the start of the 2010–11 season, Hibbert was Everton's longest-serving player, the only player who had been at the club throughout the entire reign of former manager David Moyes, and had appeared in more competitive European games than any other Everton player. In addition, he had not scored in a competitive game during his professional career. Alongside his commitment to the club, the goal drought contributed to his cult hero status among Everton fans, to the extent that a banner reading "If Hibbert Scores, We Riot" was displayed at the 2009 FA Cup semi-final.

Hibbert was awarded a testimonial match for Everton following 10 years of service. The match was played on 8 August 2012 against Greek side AEK Athens, the team against whom Hibbert made his eighteenth appearance in all European competitions for Everton, equalling a club record. Hibbert scored Everton's fourth goal, a free kick, in a 4–1 win prompting a pitch invasion.

Hibbert's 2012–13 season was littered with injuries. In the early part of the season he suffered neck and calf injuries which kept him out of action until November. He only returned for a few games before a recurrence of the calf injury forced him to have surgery which meant he did not play again until he came on as a substitute in Everton's final home game of the season. The match was manager David Moyes' last home game in charge of the side following his decision to end his 11-year reign to join Manchester United. Hibbert's appearance meant that he was the only remaining player at the club who had featured in Moyes' first squad.

The form of Séamus Coleman who was later named the club's 2013–14 Player of the Season kept Hibbert out of the first team to such an extent that he only made one league appearance during the campaign. Despite his limited first-team opportunities, manager Roberto Martínez said he was ready to offer a new deal to Hibbert. In July 2014, he signed a two-year contract with the club.

Hibbert saw very little gametime come his way over the following two seasons. At the end of the 2015–16 season he was released by the club after 25 years, of which 18 were as a professional Everton player. He announced his retirement shortly afterwards.

In April 2017 he joined amateur side Hares FC in the Skelmersdale Sunday league and continued the next season. After moving to France following the end of his professional playing career, Hibbert registered as a veteran player with amateur club ES Louzy in November 2021.

== International career ==
Hibbert was called up to the England under-21 team in October 2002 for games against Slovakia and Macedonia but he did not play in either game due to a hamstring injury.

== Personal life ==
Hibbert was the victim of a high-profile burglary in 2006. In 2013, he purchased a 33-acre French carp fishery on the outskirts of Reims called Lac de Premiere.

== Career statistics ==
Appearances and goals by club, season and competition
Club	Season	League			FA Cup		League Cup		Europe		Total	
Club	Season	Division	Apps	Goals	Apps	Goals	Apps	Goals	Apps	Goals	Apps	Goals
Everton	2000–01	Premier League	3	0	0	0	0	0	—		3	0
Everton	2001–02	Premier League	10	0	1	0	1	0	—		12	0
Everton	2002–03	Premier League	24	0	0	0	1	0	—		25	0
Everton	2003–04	Premier League	25	0	3	0	3	0	—		31	0
Everton	2004–05	Premier League	36	0	1	0	3	0	—		40	0
Everton	2005–06	Premier League	29	0	4	0	1	0	4 (Note: Two appearances in UEFA Champions League qualifying and two appearances in the UEFA Cup.)	0	38	0
Everton	2006–07	Premier League	13	0	0	0	0	0	—		13	0
Everton	2007–08	Premier League	24	0	1	0	2	0	7 (Note: Appearances in the UEFA Cup.)	0	34	0
Everton	2008–09	Premier League	17	0	6	0	0	0	1	0	24	0
Everton	2009–10	Premier League	20	0	1	0	2	0	7 (Note: Appearances in the UEFA Europa League.)	0	30	0
Everton	2010–11	Premier League	20	0	1	0	1	0	—		22	0
Everton	2011–12	Premier League	32	0	2	0	2	0	—		36	0
Everton	2012–13	Premier League	6	0	0	0	0	0	—		6	0
Everton	2013–14	Premier League	1	0	2	0	1	0	—		4	0
Everton	2014–15	Premier League	4	0	0	0	1	0	4	0	9	0
Everton	2015–16	Premier League	1	0	0	0	0	0	—		1	0
Career total			265	0	22	0	18	0	23	0	328	0

== Honours ==
Everton Youth

- FA Youth Cup: 1997–98

Everton

- FA Cup runner-up: 2008–09

== See also ==
- List of one-club men
