= 2011–12 Everton F.C. season =

English football club season

Everton
2011–12 season
- Chairman: Bill Kenwright
- Manager: David Moyes
- Stadium: Goodison Park
- Premier League: 7th
- FA Cup: Semi-Final
- League Cup: Fourth Round
- Top goalscorer: League: Nikica Jelavić (9); All: Nikica Jelavić (11)
- Highest home attendance: 39,517 v. Newcastle United (13 May 2012, Premier League)
- Lowest home attendance: 17,173 v. Sheffield United (24 August 2011, League Cup)
- Average home league attendance: 33,228 (Premier League)
Home colours	Away colours	Third colours

The 2011–12 season of Everton F.C. was the club's 20th season in the Premier League and 58th consecutive season in the top division of English football. It was also Everton's 113th season of league football and 115th season in all competitions. The club entered the League Cup in the second round and were knocked out in the fourth round following a 1–2 home defeat to Chelsea. The club entered the FA Cup in the third round and advanced all the way to the semi-finals where they faced rivals Liverpool, at Wembley, for the first time since 1989. Everton's run ensured they stretched their number of quarter-final appearances in the competition to 41, which is a record. Despite taking the lead in the semi-final, Everton lost the game 1–2.

Everton's Premier League campaign was delayed by a week due to the London riots forcing a postponement of their scheduled starting match at Tottenham Hotspur. In January, manager David Moyes became the fourth boss to win 150 Premier League games in its 20-year history, after Sir Alex Ferguson, Arsène Wenger and Harry Redknapp. Everton finished in seventh place, boasting a nine-game-long unbeaten run in the league to end the season. The unbeaten run was led by winter signing Nikica Jelavić, who scored nine goals in thirteen league games, and was awarded with the Premier League Player of the Month award for April for his efforts.

== Results ==
=== Preseason ===
15 July	Bury	1–4	Everton	Bury, Lancs.
19:45 BST	Schumacher 59'	Report	Yakubu 18'; Gueye 32', 44'; Osman 42'	Stadium: Gigg Lane; Attendance: 3,017; Referee: Jon Moss

20 July	Philadelphia Union (United States)	1–0	Everton	Chester, Pennsylvania, United States
19:30 UTC-5	Hernández 87'	Report	Heitinga (red card) 90+2'	Stadium: PPL Park; Attendance: 18,582; Referee: Jorge González

23 July	D.C. United (United States)	1–3	Everton	Washington, D.C., United States
19:30 UTC-5	Pontius 47'	Report	Anichebe 4'; Bilyaletdinov 16'; Gueye 82'	Stadium: RFK Stadium; Attendance: 12,789; Referee: Jair Marrufo

30 July	Birmingham City	1–2	Everton	Birmingham, England
15:00 BST	Rooney 78'	Report	Baines 58'; Saha 62'	Stadium: St Andrew's; Attendance: 7,572; Referee: Iain Williamson

2 August	Werder Bremen (Germany)	1–0	Everton	Bremen, Germany
19:30 CET	Wagner 37'	Report		Stadium: Weserstadion; Attendance: 17,300; Referee: Peter Gagelmann

5 August	Everton	0–1	(Spain) Villarreal	Liverpool, Lancs.
19:45 BST		Report	Rossi 64'	Stadium: Goodison Park; Attendance: 18,675; Referee: Mike Jones

15 August	Bohemians (Republic of Ireland)	1–1	Everton	Dublin, Republic of Ireland
19:45 IST	Flood 65'	Report	Beckford 9'	Stadium: Dalymount Park; Attendance: ~3,000; Referee: Neil Doyle

=== Premier League ===
20 August 1	Everton	0–1	QPR	Liverpool, Lancs.
15:00 BST	Osman (yellow card) 80'	Report	Smith 31'; Hall (yellow card) 38'	Stadium: Goodison Park; Attendance: 35,008; Referee: Kevin Friend

27 August 2	Blackburn	0–1	Everton	Blackburn, Lancs.
15:00 BST	Salgado (yellow card) 14'; Hoilett (yellow card) 24'; Petrović (yellow card) 45+1'; Nzonzi (yellow card) 55'	Report	Anichebe (yellow card) 14'; Arteta (yellow card) 52', (goal) 90+2' (pen.)	Stadium: Ewood Park; Attendance: 22,826; Referee: Lee Mason

10 September 3	Everton	2–2	Aston Villa	Liverpool, Lancs.
15:00 BST	Osman 19'; Jagielka (yellow card) 66'; Baines 69' (pen.)	Report	Petrov 63'; Agbonlahor 83', (yellow card) 84'	Stadium: Goodison Park; Attendance: 32,736; Referee: Michael Oliver

17 September 4	Everton	3–1	Wigan	Liverpool, Lancs.
15:00 BST	Jagielka 33'; Fellaini (yellow card) 60'; Vellios 84', (yellow card) 88'; Drenthe 90+8'	Report	Di Santo 31'; Caldwell (yellow card) 65'	Stadium: Goodison Park; Attendance: 31,576; Referee: Peter Walton

24 September 5	Manchester City	2–0	Everton	Manchester, Lancs.
12:45 BST	Y. Touré (yellow card) 31'; Balotelli 68'; Milner 89'	Report	Rodwell (yellow card) 20'; Neville (yellow card) 25'; Osman (yellow card) 29'; Cahill (yellow card) 63'; Jagielka (yellow card) 87'	Stadium: City of Manchester Stadium; Attendance: 47,293; Referee: Howard Webb

1 October 6	Everton	0–2	Liverpool	Walton, Liverpool
12:45 BST	Rodwell (red card) 23'; Cahill (yellow card) 28'	Report	Lucas (yellow card) 50'; Carroll 71'; Suárez 82'	Stadium: Goodison Park; Attendance: 39,510; Referee: Martin Atkinson

15 October 7	Chelsea	3–1	Everton	Fulham
17:30 BST	Sturridge 31', (yellow card) 70'; Cole (yellow card) 37'; Terry 45+2'; Ramires 61'	Report	(yellow card) 16' Fellaini; (yellow card) 42' Baines; 81' Vellios	Stadium: Stamford Bridge; Attendance: 41,789; Referee: Mike Jones

23 October 8	Fulham	1–3	Everton	Fulham
12:45 BST	Johnson (yellow card) 54'; Ruiz 67'; Sidwell (yellow card) 73'; Baird (yellow card) 90+2'	Report	Drenthe 3'; Distin (yellow card) 50'; Saha 90'; Rodwell 90+3'	Stadium: Craven Cottage; Attendance: 25,646; Referee: Lee Probert

29 October 9	Everton	0–1	Man Utd	Liverpool, Lancs.
12:00 BST	Rodwell (yellow card) 26'; Coleman (yellow card) 66'; Fellaini (yellow card) 90+5'	Report	Hernández 19'	Stadium: Goodison Park; Attendance: 35,494; Referee: Mike Halsey

5 November 10	Newcastle	2–1	Everton	Newcastle, Northd.
12:45 BST	Heitinga 12' (o.g.); R. Taylor 29', (yellow card) 82'; Guthrie (yellow card) 79'	Report	Rodwell 45'; Heitinga (yellow card) 51'; Baines (yellow card) 65'; Drenthe (yellow card) 83'	Stadium: St. James' Park; Attendance: 50,671; Referee: Andre Marriner

19 November 11	Everton	2–1	Wolves	Liverpool, Lancs.
15:00 GMT	Jagielka 44'; Baines 83' (pen.); Baines (yellow card) 90+1'	Report	Hunt 37' (pen.), (yellow card) 72'; Baines (yellow card) 71'; O'Hara (yellow card) 84'	Stadium: Goodison Park; Attendance: 33,953; Referee: Jonathan Moss

26 November 12	Bolton Wanderers	0–2	Everton	Bolton, Lancs.
15:00 GMT	Wheater (red card) 20'; Reo-Coker (yellow card) 59'	Report	Osman (yellow card) 44'; Fellaini 49'; Vellios 78'	Stadium: Reebok Stadium; Attendance: 24,058; Referee: Michael Oliver

4 December 13	Everton	0–1	Stoke City	Liverpool, Lancs.
15:00 GMT		Report	Huth 15'; Wilson (yellow card) 49'	Stadium: Goodison Park; Attendance: 33,219; Referee: Lee Mason

10 December 14	Arsenal	1–0	Everton	Holloway
15:00 GMT	Arteta (yellow card) 16'; Ramsey (yellow card) 38'; Van Persie 70'	Report	Coleman (yellow card) 24'; Distin (yellow card) 82'	Stadium: Emirates Stadium; Attendance: 60,062; Referee: Howard Webb

17 December 15	Everton	1–1	Norwich City	Liverpool, Lancs.
15:00 GMT	Neville (yellow card) 78'; Osman 81'	Report	Naughton (yellow card) 4'; Holt 28'	Stadium: Goodison Park; Attendance: 31,004; Referee: Lee Probert

21 December 16	Everton	1–0	Swansea City	Liverpool, Lancs.
20:00 GMT	Osman 60'; Gueye (yellow card) 76'	Report	Williams (yellow card) 41'; Routledge (yellow card) 69'	Stadium: Goodison Park; Attendance: 32,004; Referee: Kevin Friend

26 December 17	Sunderland	1–1	Everton	Sunderland, Dur.
15:00 GMT	Colback 26'	Report	Baines 51' (pen.); Heitinga (yellow card) 72'	Stadium: Stadium of Light; Attendance: 43,619; Referee: Howard Webb

1 January 2012 18	West Brom	0–1	Everton	West Bromwich
12:30 GMT		Report	Baines (yellow card) 85'; Anichebe 87'; Stracqualursi (yellow card) 90+3'	Stadium: The Hawthorns; Attendance: 23,038; Referee: Stuart Attwell

4 January 2012 19	Everton	1–2	Bolton Wanderers	Liverpool, Lancs.
20:00 GMT	Howard 63'; Distin (yellow card) 77'	Report	Ngog (yellow card) 12', (goal) 67'; Reo-Coker (yellow card) 21'; Cahill 78', (yellow card) 90+2'	Stadium: Goodison Park; Attendance: 29,561; Referee: Phil Dowd

11 January 2012 20	Tottenham Hotspur	2–0	Everton	Tottenham
19:45 GMT	Lennon 35', (yellow card) 74'; Assou-Ekotto 63'	Report	Donovan (yellow card) 45+2'; Cahill (yellow card) 83'; Fellaini (yellow card) 85'	Stadium: White Hart Lane; Attendance: 36,132; Referee: Martin Atkinson
Note: This match was originally scheduled on the opening weekend of the season, but it was postponed due to riots in London on August 2011

14 January 2012 21	Aston Villa	1–1	Everton	Aston, Birmingham
15:00 GMT	Bent 56'; Albrighton (yellow card) 90'	Report	Fellaini (yellow card) 35'; Anichebe 69'	Stadium: Villa Park; Attendance: 31,853; Referee: Mark Clattenburg

21 January 2012 22	Everton	1–1	Blackburn	Liverpool, Lancs.
15:00 GMT	Cahill 24'; Gibson (yellow card) 71'; Drenthe (yellow card) 83'	Report	Petrović (yellow card) 42'; Goodwillie 72'; Hoilett (yellow card) 76'	Stadium: Goodison Park; Attendance: 32,464; Referee: Mark Halsey

31 January 2012 23	Everton	1–0	Man City	Liverpool, Lancs.
20:00 GMT	Gibson 60'; Drenthe (yellow card) 77'	Report	Kompany (yellow card) 34'; Lescott (yellow card) 59'	Stadium: Goodison Park; Attendance: 29,856; Referee: Peter Walton

4 February 2012 24	Wigan	1–1	Everton	Wigan, Lancs.
15:00 GMT	McCarthy (yellow card) 56'; Neville 76' (o.g.); Figueroa (yellow card) 88'	Report	Anichebe 83'	Stadium: DW Stadium; Attendance: 18,340; Referee: Anthony Taylor

11 February 2012 25	Everton	2–0	Chelsea	Liverpool, Lancs.
15:00 GMT	Pienaar 5'; Stracqualursi 71'	Report	Meireles (yellow card) 42'; Bosingwa (yellow card) 52'; Torres (yellow card) 59'	Stadium: Goodison Park; Attendance: 33,924; Referee: Mike Jones

3 March 2012 26	QPR	1–1	Everton	White City
15:00 GMT	Zamora 36'; Derry (yellow card) 90+4'	Report	Drenthe 31', (yellow card) 36'; Pienaar (yellow card) 37'	Stadium: Loftus Road; Attendance: 18,033; Referee: Kevin Friend

10 March 2012 27	Everton	1–0	Tottenham Hotspur	Liverpool, Lancs.
17:30 GMT	Jelavić 22'; Heitinga (yellow card) 80'; Howard (yellow card) 90+5'	Report	Assou-Ekotto (yellow card) 60'; Defoe (yellow card) 61'	Stadium: Goodison Park; Attendance: 34,992; Referee: Mark Halsey

13 March 2012 28	Liverpool	3–0	Everton	Anfield, Liverpool
20:00 GMT	Gerrard 34', 51', 90+3'; José Enrique (yellow card) 90+1'	Report	Pienaar (yellow card) 55'; Baines (yellow card) 78'; Drenthe (yellow card) 84'; Hibbert (yellow card) 90+1'	Stadium: Anfield; Attendance: 44,921; Referee: Phil Dowd

21 March 2012 29	Everton	0–1	Arsenal	Liverpool, Lancs.
20:00 GMT	Cahill (yellow card) 52'; Pienaar (yellow card) 61'	Report	Vermaelen 8'; Sagna (yellow card) 39'	Stadium: Goodison Park; Attendance: 30,330; Referee: Lee Mason

24 March 2012 30	Swansea City	0–2	Everton	Swansea, Wales
15:00 GMT	Allen (yellow card) 45+1'	Report	Baines 59'; Gibson (yellow card) 73'; Jelavić 76'; Pienaar (yellow card) 83'	Stadium: Liberty Stadium; Attendance: 20,509; Referee: Neil Swarbrick

31 March 2012 31	Everton	2–0	West Brom	Liverpool, Lancs.
15:00 BST	Osman 18'; Jelavić (yellow card) 55'; Cahill (yellow card) 60'; Anichebe 68'	Report	Olsson (yellow card) 65'	Stadium: Goodison Park; Attendance: 32,051; Referee: Peter Walton

7 April 2012 32	Norwich City	2–2	Everton	Norwich, Norfs.
15:00 BST	Howson 39'; Holt 76'	Report	Jelavić 22', 61'; Baines (yellow card) 24'; Pienaar (yellow card) 55'; Fellaini (yellow card) 65'	Stadium: Carrow Road; Attendance: 26,554; Referee: Andre Marriner

9 April 2012 33	Everton	4–0	Sunderland	Liverpool, Lancs.
15:00 BST	Gueye 52'; Pienaar 75'; Osman 76'; Colback 81' (o.g.)	Report	Cattermole (yellow card) 18'; Richardson (yellow card) 83'	Stadium: Goodison Park; Attendance: 32,249; Referee: Kevin Friend

22 April 2012 34	Man Utd	4–4	Everton	Manchester, Lancs.
12:30 BST	Rooney 41', 69'; Evra (yellow card) 47'; Welbeck 57'; Nani 60'	Report	Jelavić 33', 83'; Distin (yellow card) 45+3'; Neville (yellow card) 59'; Fellaini 67'; Pienaar 85'	Stadium: Old Trafford; Attendance: 75,522; Referee: Mike Jones

28 April 2012 35	Everton	4–0	Fulham	Liverpool, Lancs.
15:00 BST	Jelavić 7' (pen.), 40'; Fellaini 16'; Gibson (yellow card) 43'; Cahill 60'	Report	Diarra (yellow card) 79'	Stadium: Goodison Park; Attendance: 31,885; Referee: Phil Dowd

1 May 2012 36	Stoke City	1–1	Everton	Stoke, Staffs.
19:45 BST	Wilson (yellow card) 55'; Shawcross (yellow card) 62'; Jerome 69'	Report	Crouch 45' (o.g.); Pienaar (yellow card) 90+4'	Stadium: Britannia Stadium; Attendance: 26,500; Referee: Anthony Taylor

6 May 2012 37	Wolves	0–0	Everton	Wolverhampton
14:00 BST		Report		Stadium: Molineux; Attendance: 25,466; Referee: Lee Mason

13 May 2012 38	Everton	3–1	Newcastle	Liverpool, Lancs.
15:00 BST	Heitinga (yellow card) 7', (goal) 65'; Pienaar 16'; Jelavić 27'; Baines (yellow card) 45+4'; Cahill (red card) 90+6'	Report	Tioté (yellow card) 10'; Hibbert 73' (o.g.)	Stadium: Goodison Park; Attendance: 39,517; Referee: Andre Marriner

=== League Cup ===
24 August 2nd round	Everton	3–1	Sheffield Utd	Liverpool, Lancs.
20:00 BST	Cresswell 31' (o.g.); Anichebe 37'; Arteta (yellow card) 40', (goal) 42'; Fellaini (yellow card) 79'	Report	Jean-François (yellow card) 18'; Cresswell 28'; Flynn (yellow card) 32'	Stadium: Goodison Park; Attendance: 17,173; Referee: Nigel Miller

21 September 3rd round	Everton	2–1 (a.e.t.)	West Brom	Liverpool, Lancs.
20:00	Mucha (yellow card) 56'; Drenthe (yellow card) 63'; Fellaini 89'; Neville 103'	Report	Dorrans (yellow card) 33'; Brunt 57' (pen.)	Stadium: Goodison Park; Attendance: 17,647; Referee: Jonathan Moss

26 October 4th round	Everton	1–2 (a.e.t.)	Chelsea	Liverpool, Lancs.
20:00	Fellaini (yellow card) 20'; Saha 83'; Drenthe (yellow card) 75' (yellow-red card) 107'	Report	Alex (yellow card) 23'; Kalou 38'; Turnbull (red card) 58'; Mikel (yellow card) 76'; Sturridge 116'	Stadium: Goodison Park; Attendance: 23,170; Referee: Lee Mason

=== FA Cup ===
7 January 2012 Third round	Everton	2–0	Tamworth	Liverpool, Lancs.
15:00 UTC	Heitinga 5'; Baines 79' (pen.)	Report	Collister (yellow card) 79'	Stadium: Goodison Park; Attendance: 27,564; Referee: Bobby Madley

27 January 2012 Fourth round	Everton	2–1	Fulham	Liverpool, Lancs.
20:00 UTC	Heitinga (yellow card) 13'; Stracqualursi 27'; Gibson (yellow card) 37'; Cahill (yellow card) 57'; Fellaini 73'	Report	Murphy 14' (pen.); Baird (yellow card) 73'; Dempsey (yellow card) 86'	Stadium: Goodison Park; Attendance: 25,300; Referee: Howard Webb

18 February 2012 Fifth Round	Everton	2–0	Blackpool	Liverpool, Lancs.
15:00 GMT	Drenthe 1'; Stracqualursi 6'	Report	Baptiste (yellow card) 82'	Stadium: Goodison Park; Attendance: 38,347; Referee: Michael Oliver

17 March 2012 Sixth Round	Everton	1–1	Sunderland	Liverpool, Lancs.
12:45 GMT	Neville (yellow card) 9'; Cahill 23'; Heitinga (yellow card) 31'; Distin (yellow card) 67'	Report	Bardsley 12'; Bendtner (yellow card) 28'; Turner (yellow card) 69'	Stadium: Goodison Park; Attendance: 38,875; Referee: Andre Marriner

27 March 2012 Sixth Round Replay	Sunderland	0–2	Everton	Sunderland, Dur.
20:00 GMT	Bardsley (yellow card) 74'; Larsson (yellow card) 76'; Cattermole (yellow card) 89'	Report	Jelavić 24', (yellow card) 75'; Gibson (yellow card) 35'; Vaughan 57' (o.g.); Gueye (yellow card) 66'; Fellaini (yellow card) 72'; Heitinga (yellow card) 77'	Stadium: Stadium of Light; Attendance: 43,140; Referee: Lee Probert

14 April 2012 Semi-final	Liverpool	2–1	Everton	Wembley
15:00 GMT	Škrtel (yellow card) 59'; Suárez 62'; Henderson (yellow card) 73'; Carroll 87'	Report	Jelavić 24', (yellow card) 59'; Distin (yellow card) 37'; Coleman (yellow card) 79'	Stadium: Wembley Stadium; Attendance: 87,231; Referee: Howard Webb

== League table ==
Pos	Team	Pld	W	D	L	GF	GA	GD	Pts	Qualification or relegation
5	Newcastle United	38	19	8	11	56	51	+5	65	Qualification for the Europa League play-off round (Note: Chelsea won the Champions League and thus qualified for the group stage as defending champions, forfeiting their spot in the Europa League as the FA Cup winners. This meant that Tottenham were to compete in the Europa League group stage, since, pursuant to the rules, only four clubs from the Premier League could play in the Champions League.)
6	Chelsea	38	18	10	10	65	46	+19	64	Qualification for the Champions League group stage
7	Everton	38	15	11	12	50	40	+10	56	
8	Liverpool	38	14	10	14	47	40	+7	52	Qualification for the Europa League third qualifying round (Note: Liverpool won the League Cup and thus qualified for the Europa League third qualifying round.)
9	Fulham	38	14	10	14	48	51	−3	52	

Source: Barclays Premier League
Rules for classification: 1) points; 2) goal difference; 3) number of goals scored.

== Players ==
=== First-team squad ===
Note: Flags indicate national team as defined under FIFA eligibility rules; some limited exceptions apply. Players may hold more than one non-FIFA nationality.

No.	Pos.	Nation	Player
1	GK	SVK	Ján Mucha
2	DF	ENG	Tony Hibbert
3	DF	ENG	Leighton Baines
4	MF	IRL	Darron Gibson
5	DF	NED	John Heitinga
6	DF	ENG	Phil Jagielka (vice-captain)
7	FW	CRO	Nikica Jelavić
10	MF	NED	Royston Drenthe (on loan from Real Madrid)
11	FW	ARG	Denis Stracqualursi (on loan from Tigre)
12	GK	USA	Marcus Hahnemann
14	FW	SCO	James McFadden
15	DF	FRA	Sylvain Distin
17	MF	AUS	Tim Cahill
18	DF	ENG	Phil Neville (captain)
19	FW	FRA	Magaye Gueye
20	MF	ENG	Ross Barkley

No.	Pos.	Nation	Player
21	MF	ENG	Leon Osman
22	MF	RSA	Steven Pienaar (on loan from Tottenham Hotspur)
23	DF	IRL	Séamus Coleman
24	GK	USA	Tim Howard
25	MF	BEL	Marouane Fellaini
26	MF	ENG	Jack Rodwell
27	FW	GRE	Apostolos Vellios
28	FW	NGR	Victor Anichebe
29	FW	POR	João Silva
30	MF	POR	Francisco Júnior
31	MF	ENG	Adam Forshaw
34	DF	IRL	Shane Duffy
43	FW	ENG	Conor McAleny

==== Out on loan ====
Note: Flags indicate national team as defined under FIFA eligibility rules; some limited exceptions apply. Players may hold more than one non-FIFA nationality.

No.	Pos.	Nation	Player
6	DF	NGR	Joseph Yobo (at Fenerbahçe)
70	MF	AZE	Araz Abdullayev (at Panionios)

== Statistics ==
=== League results summary ===
Overall								Home						Away					
Pld	W	D	L	GF	GA	GD	Pts	W	D	L	GF	GA	GD	W	D	L	GF	GA	GD
38	15	11	12	50	40	+10	56	10	3	6	28	15	+13	5	8	6	22	25	−3

Last updated: 13 May 2012.
Source: Results

=== Appearances ===
As of match played 13 May 2012

No.	Pos	Nat	Player	Total		Premier League		FA Cup		League Cup	
No.	Pos	Nat	Player	Apps	Goals	Apps	Goals	Apps	Goals	Apps	Goals
1	GK	(Slovakia) SVK	Ján Mucha	3	0	0+0	0	0+0	0	3+0	0
2	DF	(England) ENG	Tony Hibbert	36	0	31+1	0	1+1	0	1+1	0
3	DF	(England) ENG	Leighton Baines	42	5	33+0	4	5+1	1	3+0	0
4	MF	(Republic of Ireland) IRL	Darron Gibson	15	1	11+0	1	4+0	0	0+0	0
5	DF	(Netherlands) NED	John Heitinga	39	2	29+1	1	6+0	1	3+0	0
6	DF	(England) ENG	Phil Jagielka	33	2	29+1	2	0+1	0	2+0	0
7	FW	(Croatia) CRO	Nikica Jelavić	16	11	10+3	9	3+0	2	0+0	0
10	MF	(Netherlands) NED	Royston Drenthe	27	4	10+11	3	2+2	1	2+0	0
11	FW	(Argentina) ARG	Denis Stracqualursi	27	3	7+13	1	2+3	2	1+1	0
12	GK	(United States) USA	Marcus Hahnemann	0	0	0+0	0	0+0	0	0+0	0
14	FW	(Scotland) SCO	James McFadden	8	0	2+5	0	1+0	0	0+0	0
15	DF	(France) FRA	Sylvain Distin	33	0	24+3	0	5+0	0	1+0	0
17	MF	(Australia) AUS	Tim Cahill	42	3	27+8	2	4+1	1	1+1	0
18	DF	(England) ENG	Phil Neville	36	1	24+3	0	6+0	0	2+1	1
19	FW	(France) FRA	Magaye Gueye	24	1	3+14	1	5+1	0	0+1	0
20	MF	(England) ENG	Ross Barkley	9	0	2+4	0	0+1	0	2+0	0
21	MF	(England) ENG	Leon Osman	34	5	28+2	5	3+0	0	1+0	0
22	MF	(South Africa) RSA	Steven Pienaar	14	4	14+0	4	0+0	0	0+0	0
23	DF	(Republic of Ireland) IRL	Séamus Coleman	24	0	14+4	0	2+2	0	1+1	0
24	GK	(United States) USA	Tim Howard	44	1	38+0	1	6+0	0	0+0	0
25	MF	(Belgium) BEL	Marouane Fellaini	43	5	31+3	3	6+0	1	3+0	1
26	MF	(England) ENG	Jack Rodwell	17	2	11+3	2	0+0	0	3+0	0
27	FW	(Greece) GRE	Apostolos Vellios	15	3	2+11	3	0+1	0	0+1	0
28	FW	(Nigeria) NGR	Victor Anichebe	16	5	5+7	4	1+2	0	1+0	1
29	FW	(Portugal) POR	João Silva	0	0	0+0	0	0+0	0	0+0	0
30	MF	(Portugal) POR	Francisco Júnior	0	0	0+0	0	0+0	0	0+0	0
31	MF	(England) ENG	Adam Forshaw	0	0	0+0	0	0+0	0	0+0	0
34	DF	(Republic of Ireland) IRL	Shane Duffy	5	0	2+2	0	1+0	0	0+0	0
37	MF	(England) ENG	Jose Baxter	2	0	0+1	0	0+0	0	0+1	0
38	MF	(England) ENG	James Wallace	0	0	0+0	0	0+0	0	0+0	0
43	FW	(England) ENG	Conor McAleny	2	0	0+2	0	0+0	0	0+0	0
Players who no longer play for Everton but have made appearances this season:
7	MF	(Russia) RUS	Diniyar Bilyaletdinov	12	0	7+3	0	1+0	0	1+0	0
8	FW	(France) FRA	Louis Saha	20	2	15+3	1	0+0	0	1+1	1
9	FW	(United States) USA	Landon Donovan	9	0	7+0	0	2+0	0	0+0	0
10	MF	(Spain) ESP	Mikel Arteta	3	2	1+1	1	0+0	0	1+0	1
16	FW	(England) ENG	Jermaine Beckford	2	0	1+1	0	0+0	0	0+0	0

=== Goalscorers ===
As of match played 13 May 2012

Nat	Name	Premier League	League Cup	FA Cup	Total
(Croatia)	Nikica Jelavić	9	0	2	11
(Nigeria)	Victor Anichebe	4	1	0	5
(England)	Leighton Baines	4	0	1	5
(Belgium)	Marouane Fellaini	3	1	1	5
(England)	Leon Osman	5	0	0	5
(South Africa)	Steven Pienaar	4	0	0	4
(Netherlands)	Royston Drenthe	3	0	1	4
(Australia)	Tim Cahill	2	0	1	3
(Greece)	Apostolos Vellios	3	0	0	3
(Argentina)	Denis Stracqualursi	1	0	2	3
(England)	Phil Jagielka	2	0	0	2
(England)	Jack Rodwell	2	0	0	2
(Netherlands)	John Heitinga	1	0	1	2
(Spain)	Mikel Arteta	1	1	0	2
(France)	Louis Saha	1	1	0	2
(Republic of Ireland)	Darron Gibson	1	0	0	1
(France)	Magaye Gueye	1	0	0	1
(United States)	Tim Howard	1	0	0	1
(England)	Phil Neville	0	1	0	1
Own Goals		2	1	1	4
	Total	50	6	10	66

=== Clean sheets ===
"It's getting harder and harder to get clean sheets now. So many goals get scored in the Premier League and for whatever reason they're hard to come by. It's why you're so happy when you finally get one. There's so much going on in this league – we have some of the world's best players and one moment of hesitation in a game, one slip-up and bang, somebody will capitalise on it." 28 November 2011

— Tim Howard, Everton first choice goalkeeper, on the lack of clean sheets.

Includes all competitive matches.

R	Nat	Name	Premier League	FA Cup	League Cup	Total
1	(United States)	Tim Howard	12	3	0	15
2	(Slovakia)	Ján Mucha	0	0	0	0
		Total	12	3	0	15

Last updated: 6 May 2012
Source: Match reports in Results

=== Disciplinary record ===
Includes all competitive matches. Sorting is based on the UEFA Fair Play criteria that a yellow card is worth one point and a red card is worth three points.

R	Nat	Name	Premier League			League Cup			FA Cup			Total		
R	Nat	Name	Yellow card	(yellow card) (yellow-red card)	Red card	Yellow card	(yellow card) (yellow-red card)	Red card	Yellow card	(yellow card) (yellow-red card)	Red card	Yellow card	(yellow card) (yellow-red card)	Red card
1	(Australia)	Tim Cahill	5	0	1	0	0	0	1	0	0	6	0	1
=	(Netherlands)	Royston Drenthe	5	0	0	1	1	0	0	0	0	6	1	0
=	(Belgium)	Marouane Fellaini	6	0	0	2	0	0	1	0	0	9	0	0
4	(England)	Leighton Baines	7	0	0	0	0	0	0	0	0	7	0	0
=	(Netherlands)	John Heitinga	4	0	0	0	0	0	3	0	0	7	0	0
6	(France)	Sylvain Distin	4	0	0	0	0	0	2	0	0	6	0	0
=	(South Africa)	Steven Pienaar	6	0	0	0	0	0	0	0	0	6	0	0
8	(England)	Jack Rodwell	2	0	1	0	0	0	0	0	0	2	0	1 (Note: Red card against Liverpool on 1 October 2011 was rescinded on appeal.)
=	(Republic of Ireland)	Darron Gibson	3	0	0	0	0	0	2	0	0	5	0	0
10	(England)	Phil Neville	3	0	0	0	0	0	1	0	0	4	0	0
11	(Croatia)	Nikica Jelavić	1	0	0	0	0	0	2	0	0	3	0	0
=	(England)	Leon Osman	3	0	0	0	0	0	0	0	0	3	0	0
13	(Republic of Ireland)	Séamus Coleman	2	0	0	0	0	0	0	0	0	2	0	0
=	(France)	Magaye Gueye	1	0	0	0	0	0	1	0	0	2	0	0
=	(England)	Phil Jagielka	2	0	0	0	0	0	0	0	0	2	0	0
=	(Spain)	Mikel Arteta	1	0	0	1	0	0	0	0	0	2	0	0
17	(Nigeria)	Victor Anichebe	1	0	0	0	0	0	0	0	0	1	0	0
=	(United States)	Landon Donovan	1	0	0	0	0	0	0	0	0	1	0	0
=	(England)	Tony Hibbert	1	0	0	0	0	0	0	0	0	1	0	0
=	(United States)	Tim Howard	1	0	0	0	0	0	0	0	0	1	0	0
=	(Argentina)	Denis Stracqualursi	1	0	0	0	0	0	0	0	0	1	0	0
=	(Greece)	Apostolos Vellios	1	0	0	0	0	0	0	0	0	1	0	0
=	(Slovakia)	Ján Mucha	0	0	0	1	0	0	0	0	0	1	0	0
		Total	61	0	2	5	1	0	13	0	0	79	1	2

Last updated: 13 May 2012
Source: Match reports in Results

=== Home attendances ===
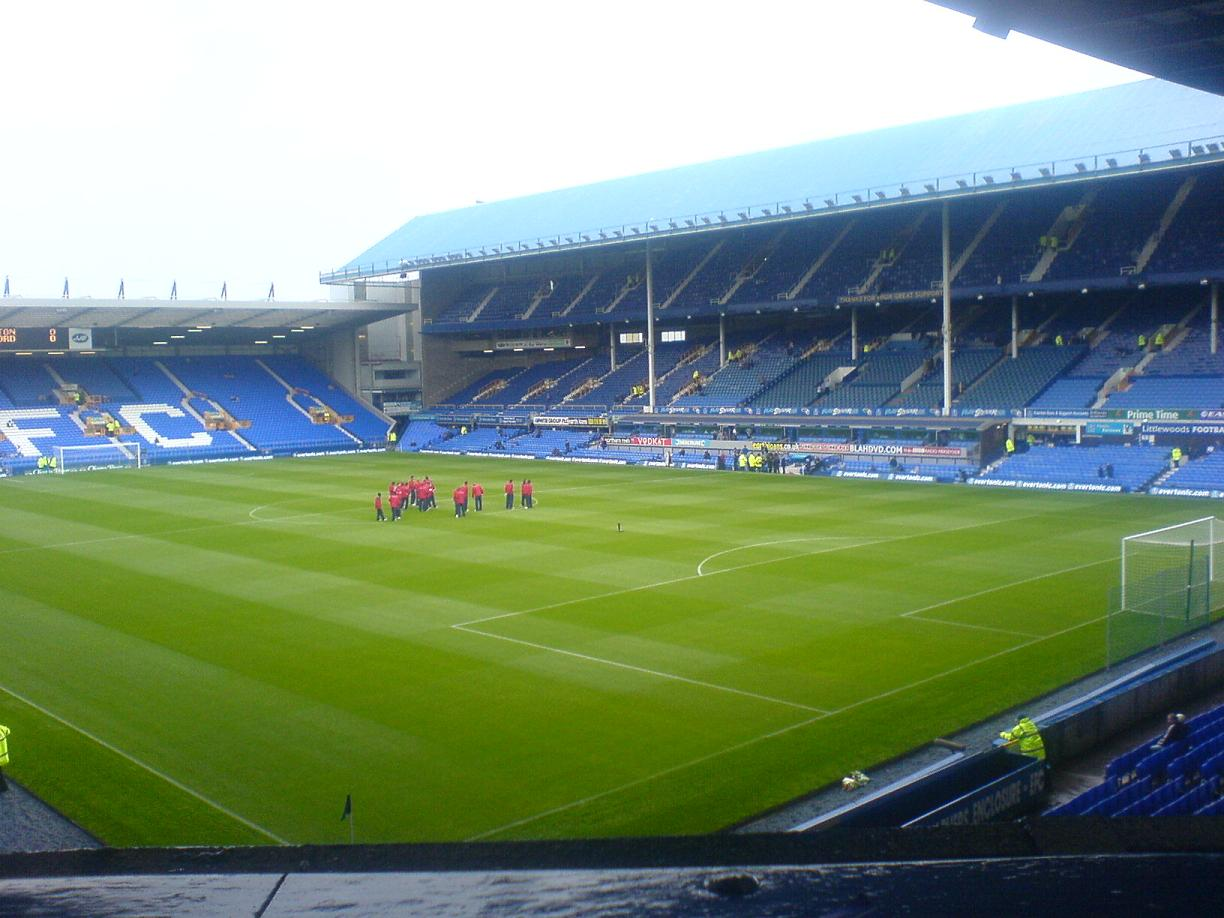
Goodison Park – Everton's home ground

"I am a football supporter, first and foremost. I know how it works. If I am winning games, supporters will turn up. I, as manager of Everton, have not won enough games this season for them to come. I have not entertained them enough. We have not scored enough goals. I need to do that to get the supporters to fill Goodison. Over the years, in the main, we have done that. But the fans on the road have seen a few victories." 3 January 2012

— David Moyes, Everton manager, on low attendances at Goodison Park.

Correct as of match played 13 May 2012
Win Draw Loss

Comp	Date	Score	Opponent	Attendance
Premier League	20 August 2011	0–1	Queens Park Rangers	35,008
League Cup	24 August 2011	3–1	Sheffield United	17,173
Premier League	10 September 2011	2–2	Aston Villa	32,736
Premier League	17 September 2011	3–1	Wigan Athletic	31,576
League Cup	21 September 2011	2–1	West Bromwich Albion	17,647
Premier League	1 October 2011	0–2	Liverpool	39,510
League Cup	26 October 2011	1–2	Chelsea	23,170
Premier League	29 October 2011	0–1	Manchester United	35,494
Premier League	19 November 2011	2–1	Wolverhampton Wanderers	33,953
Premier League	4 December 2011	0–1	Stoke City	33,219
Premier League	17 December 2011	1–1	Norwich City	31,004
Premier League	21 December 2011	1–0	Swansea City	32,004
Premier League	4 January 2012	1–2	Bolton Wanderers	29,561
FA Cup	7 January 2012	2–0	Tamworth	27,564
Premier League	21 January 2012	1–1	Blackburn Rovers	32,464
FA Cup	27 January 2012	2–1	Fulham	25,300
Premier League	31 January 2012	1–0	Manchester City	29,856
Premier League	11 February 2012	2–0	Chelsea	33,924
FA Cup	18 February 2012	2–0	Blackpool	38,347
Premier League	10 March 2012	1–0	Tottenham Hotspur	34,992
FA Cup	17 March 2012	1–1	Sunderland	38,875
Premier League	21 March 2012	0–1	Arsenal	30,330
Premier League	31 March 2012	2–0	West Bromwich Albion	32,051
Premier League	9 April 2012	4–0	Sunderland	32,249
Premier League	28 April 2012	4–0	Fulham	31,885
Premier League	13 May 2012	3–1	Newcastle United	39,517
			Total attendance	780,812
			Total league attendance	631,333
			Average attendance	30,031
			Average league attendance	33,228

=== Overall ===
"You can’t really celebrate finishing seventh. You celebrate if you are first or maybe if you get into the Champions League, or you celebrate if you get to seventh and it gets you into Europe. But nevertheless, from where we were in October and November, and the people we have had to overtake to get to where we are and the points we were behind, it has been a brilliant achievement for the players to come back from so far away. With our form, we don’t want the season to end. It was definitely the best January we have had because in the main it’s not a month I’d do much business. We needed it because we weren’t in a good position. We beat Fulham in the Cup and then we beat Man City here and that was probably the catalyst with Darron Gibson in the team and we knew Steven Pienaar and Nikica Jelavic would arrive that night. We have to try and build on it and see if we can start the season a bit better and take it into next season. We have tried to progress and get better players in. That isn’t always easy. It wasn’t a quick fix here, the way we do it is a longer, slower job than just going out and spending the cash. I take a lot of heart from it. It gives me a good feeling we’ve played so well but we’ve done that for a few years, playing well in pockets of the season. There have been bits when we’ve had the style and bits when we’ve not but that’s about quality players. We had quality players but they needed help and the players we brought in January helped."

— David Moyes reviewing the season (14 May 2012)

Includes all competitive games.

Games played	47 (38 Premier League, 3 League Cup, 6 FA Cup)
Games won	21 (15 Premier League, 2 League Cup, 4 FA Cup)
Games drawn	12 (11 Premier League) and 1 FA Cup)
Games lost	14 (12 Premier League, 1 League Cup and 1 FA Cup)
Goals scored	66 (50 Premier League, 6 League Cup, 10 FA Cup)
Goals conceded	48 (40 Premier League, 4 League Cup, 4 FA Cup)
Goal difference	+18 (+10 Premier League, +2 League Cup, +6 FA Cup)
Clean sheets	15 (12 Premier League and 3 FA Cup)
Yellow cards	79
Red cards	3
Worst discipline	(Australia) Tim Cahill (1 (red card) and 6 (yellow card) ) (Netherlands) Royston Drenthe (1 (red card) and 6 (yellow card) ) (Belgium) Marouane Fellaini (9 (yellow card) )
Best results	W 4–0 (H) v Sunderland – Premier League – 9 April 2012; W 4–0 (H) v Fulham – Premier League – 28 April 2012
Worst result	L 3–0 (A) v Liverpool – Premier League – 13 March 2012
Most appearances	(United States) Tim Howard with 44 appearances
Top scorer	Nikica Jelavić (11)
Penalties for	6/7 (86% converted)
Penalties against	3/5 (60% converted)
Points (League)	56/114 (49%)
Win rate	21/47 games (45%)

Last updated: 13 May 2012
Source: Competitive matches and Statistics

== Transfers ==
=== Transfers in ===
Player	From	Date (Note: Players to sign transfers on or prior to 30 June do not officially move until 1 July.)	Fee
(United States) Marcus Hahnemann	Unattached	23 September 2011	Free
(Scotland) James McFadden	Unattached	17 October 2011	Free
(Republic of Ireland) Darron Gibson	(England) Manchester United	13 January 2012	Undisclosed (~£0.5M)
(Croatia) Nikica Jelavić	(Scotland) Rangers	31 January 2012	£5.5 million
(Portugal) Francisco Júnior	Unattached	14 February 2012	Free

=== Transfers out ===
Player	To	Date	Fee
(England) James Vaughan	(England) Norwich City	27 May 2011	£2.5 million
(Scotland) Iain Turner	(England) Preston North End	1 June 2011	Free
(England) Kieran Agard	(England) Yeovil Town	1 June 2011	Free
(Nigeria) Hope Akpan	(England) Crawley Town	1 June 2011	Free
(England) John Nolan	(England) Stockport County	12 July 2011	Free
(Spain) Mikel Arteta	(England) Arsenal	31 August 2011	£10 million
(Nigeria) Yakubu	(England) Blackburn Rovers	31 August 2011	Undisclosed (~£1.5M)
(England) Jermaine Beckford	(England) Leicester City	31 August 2011	£3 million
(Germany) Shkodran Mustafi	(Italy) Sampdoria	4 January 2012	Free
(Russia) Diniyar Bilyaletdinov	(Russia) Spartak Moscow	29 January 2012	£5 million
(France) Louis Saha	(England) Tottenham Hotspur	31 January 2012	Free

=== Loans in ===
Player	From	Date	Length of loan
(Netherlands) Royston Drenthe	(Spain) Real Madrid	31 August 2011	Season-long loan
(Argentina) Denis Stracqualursi	(Argentina) Tigre	31 August 2011	Season-long loan
(United States) Landon Donovan	(United States) LA Galaxy	15 December 2011 (Note: Loan was announced on 15 December 2011, with Donovan arriving over the Christmas period and being eligible to play from 4 January to 25 February 2012.)	Two-month loan
(South Africa) Steven Pienaar	(England) Tottenham Hotspur	31 January 2012	Six-month loan

=== Loans out ===
Player	To	Date	Length of loan
(Portugal) João Silva	(Portugal) Vitória de Setúbal	12 August 2011	Season-long loan
(Republic of Ireland) Shane Duffy	(England) Scunthorpe United	31 August 2011 (Note: Loan was originally for one-month, but was extended multiple times, with Duffy eventually leaving on 5 January 2012, due to an injury crisis at Everton.)	Four-month loan
(Nigeria) Joseph Yobo	(Turkey) Fenerbahçe	6 September 2011	Season-long loan
(England) Jose Baxter	(England) Tranmere Rovers	22 September 2011	One-month loan
(England) James Wallace	(England) Shrewsbury Town	3 November 2011 (Note: Loan was originally for one-month, but a second was added on 30 November 2011.)	Two-month loan
(England) James Wallace	(England) Stevenage	10 January 2012 (Note: Loan was cancelled on 17 January 2012, due to Stevenage manager Graham Westley leaving the club.)	One-month loan
(England) James Wallace	(England) Tranmere Rovers	19 January 2012 (Note: Loan was originally for one-month, but was extended until the end of the season.)	Five-month loan
(England) Adam Forshaw	(England) Brentford	24 February 2012	Four-month loan
(England) Conor McAleny	(England) Scunthorpe United	23 March 2012	Two-month loan

== Awards ==
=== Player of the Month ===
(Note: awarded by Everton F.C. to the best first team Everton player of the month.)

Month	Pos.	Name
August	GK	(United States) Tim Howard
September	DF	(England) Tony Hibbert
October	MF	(England) Jack Rodwell
November	DF	(England) Phil Jagielka
December	DF	(England) Leighton Baines
January	MF	(United States) Landon Donovan
February	FW	(Argentina) Denis Stracqualursi
March	DF	(Netherlands) John Heitinga
April	FW	(Croatia) Nikica Jelavić

=== Premier League Player of the Month ===
(Note: awarded to the best player in the Premier League during a given month, as chosen by a panel assembled by the League's sponsor.)

Month	Pos.	Name
April	FW	(Croatia) Nikica Jelavić

=== PFA Premier League Team of the Year ===
(Note: awarded to the best XI of the Premier League season, as chosen by the Professional Footballers' Association.)

Pos.	Name
DF	(England) Leighton Baines

=== End-of-season awards ===
(Note: in-club awards ceremony held at the end of every season.)

Award	Winner
Player of the Season	(Netherlands) John Heitinga
Players' Player of the Season	(France) Sylvain Distin
Young Player of the Season	(Greece) Apostolos Vellios
Reserve Player of the Season	(England) Adam Forshaw
Academy Player of the Season	(England) Hallam Hope
Goal of the Season	(England) Phil Neville vs. West Bromwich Albion
