= Ján Mucha =

Slovak footballer

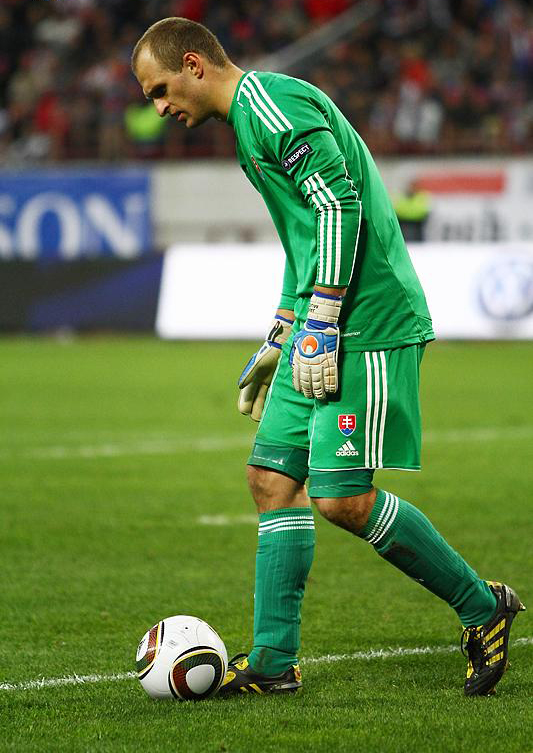
- Mucha with Slovakia in 2010

Personal information
- Date of birth: 5 December 1982 (age 43)
- Place of birth: Belá nad Cirochou, Czechoslovakia
- Height: 1.89 m (6 ft 2 in)
- Position: Goalkeeper

Team information
- Current team: Slovan Bratislava (goalkeeping coach)

Youth career
- TJ Slovan Belá nad Cirochou
- MŠK Snina
- 1997–2000: Inter Bratislava

Senior career*
Years	Team	Apps	(Gls)
2000–2002	Inter Bratislava	0	(0)
2002–2005	Žilina	12	(0)
2005	→ Humenné (loan)		
2005–2010	Legia Warsaw	95	(0)
2010–2013	Everton	2	(0)
2013–2015	Krylia Sovetov Samara	10	(0)
2015	→ Arsenal Tula (loan)	12	(0)
2015–2017	Slovan Bratislava	51	(0)
2017–2018	Bruk-Bet Termalica	27	(0)
2018–2019	Hamilton Academical	2	(0)
Total		211	(0)

International career
2008–2016	Slovakia	46	(0)

Managerial career
- 2019–2021: Legia Warsaw (goalkeeping coach)
- 2021: Legia Warsaw (goalkeeping coach)
- 2023–: Slovan Bratislava (goalkeeping coach)
- * Club domestic league appearances and goals

Ján Mucha (born 5 December 1982) is a Slovak former professional footballer who played as a goalkeeper. He is also involved in football trade unions as a footballing expert in the media.

== Club career ==
=== Everton ===
In January 2010, Mucha signed a pre-contract deal with English Premier League club Everton to join them on 1 July. On 4 August 2010, Mucha made his Everton debut playing the first 45 minutes of a pre-season friendly against Chilean side Everton de Viña del Mar at Goodison Park, before being replaced in goal by Iain Turner at half-time. His competitive debut for Everton came in the first match of their League Cup campaign, a 5–1 win over Huddersfield Town. He went on to play in the successive League Cup match against Brentford, in which he saved a penalty kick in the second half, but could not keep his side in the competition in the penalty shootout to decide the match, which Everton lost 4–3. Mucha made his sixth appearance for the club and his first in the 2012/13 season in a League Cup tie at home to Leyton Orient in August 2012, which Everton won 5–0. Mucha played in the next round as Everton lost 2–1 away to Leeds United.

He was on the bench in all 38 Premier League fixtures of 2010–11 and 2011–12 seasons as an unused sub. On 2 March 2013, with regular keeper Tim Howard injured, Mucha finally made his league debut for Everton in a 3–1 home win against Reading. On 9 March 2013, with Howard still injured, Mucha made his FA Cup debut in a 3–0 home loss to Wigan. He made his 10th appearance for the club the following week in a home league game against Manchester City. Everton ran out 2–0 winners with Mucha producing a string of fine saves. Mucha left Everton when his contract expired at the end of the season.

=== Krylia Sovetov Samara ===
In July 2013, Mucha signed for Russian side Krylia Sovetov Samara.

On 15 January 2015, Mucha signed with Arsenal Tula on loan till the end of the 2014–15 season.

=== Slovan Bratislava ===
On 28 June 2015, Mucha signed a four-year contract with Slovak club ŠK Slovan Bratislava.

=== Bruk-Bet Termalica Nieciecza ===
On 29 June 2017, Mucha joined Ekstraklasa side Bruk-Bet Termalica Nieciecza.

=== Hamilton Academical ===
In November 2018, Mucha signed a short-term deal with Scottish club Hamilton Academical. The contract expired on 1 January 2019 and he left the club.

== International career ==
Mucha made his debut for Slovakia in February 2008, in a friendly match against Hungary, and became the national team's first-choice goalkeeper. When Slovakia qualified for the FIFA World Cup for the first time, in 2010, Mucha played in all four games as Slovakia made it to the second round of the competition. Later he was selected for Euro 2016.

== After retirement ==
After his retirement Mucha became involved as a player's representative and an inaugural President of Slovakia's first footballer's trade union - Union of Football Professionals. He also became an occasional media pundit with public broadcaster RTVS as well as AMC Network's Sport1, especially for Slovakia national team or Slovak clubs in European competitions. Mucha also became a regular columnist for Denník Šport.

== Personal life ==
In March 2013, Mucha was ordered to do 250 hours of community service after being caught driving with a suspended license.

== Career statistics ==
=== Club ===
Appearances and goals by club, season and competition
Club	Season	League			National cup		League cup		Europe		Other		Total	
Club	Season	Division	Apps	Goals	Apps	Goals	Apps	Goals	Apps	Goals	Apps	Goals	Apps	Goals
Inter Bratislava	2000–01	Slovak Superliga	0	0	0	0	—		0	0	—		0	0
Inter Bratislava	2001–02	Slovak Superliga	0	0	0	0	—		0	0	—		0	0
Inter Bratislava	Total		0	0	0	0	—		0	0	—		0	0
Žilina	2002–03	Slovak Superliga	0	0	0	0	—		0	0	—		0	0
Žilina	2003–04	Slovak Superliga	0	0	0	0	—		0	0	0	0	0	0
Žilina	2004–05	Slovak Superliga	12	0	0	0	—		1	0	1	0	14	0
Žilina	Total		12	0	0	0	—		1	0	1	0	14	0
Legia Warsaw	2005–06	Ekstraklasa	0	0	4	0	—		0	0	—		4	0
Legia Warsaw	2006–07	Ekstraklasa	7	0	0	0	—		0	0	0	0	7	0
Legia Warsaw	2007–08	Ekstraklasa	29	0	5	0	—		0	0	—		34	0
Legia Warsaw	2008–09	Ekstraklasa	29	0	2	0	—		4	0	1	0	36	0
Legia Warsaw	2009–10	Ekstraklasa	30	0	4	0	—		4	0	—		38	0
Legia Warsaw	Total		95	0	15	0	—		8	0	1	0	119	0
Everton	2010–11	Premier League	0	0	0	0	2	0	—		—		2	0
Everton	2011–12	Premier League	0	0	0	0	3	0	—		—		3	0
Everton	2012–13	Premier League	2	0	1	0	2	0	—		—		5	0
Everton	Total		2	0	1	0	7	0	—		—		10	0
Krylia Sovetov Samara	2013–14	Russian Premier League	10	0	0	0	—		—		2	0	12	0
Krylia Sovetov Samara	2014–15	Russian Football National League	0	0	2	0	—		—		—		2	0
Krylia Sovetov Samara	Total		10	0	2	0	—		—		2	0	14	0
Arsenal Tula (loan)	2014–15	Russian Premier League	12	0	0	0	—		—		—		12	0
Slovan Bratislava	2015–16	Slovak First Football League	28	0	4	0	—		4	0	—		36	0
Slovan Bratislava	2016–17	Slovak First Football League	23	0	3	0	—		3	0	—		29	0
Slovan Bratislava	Total		51	0	7	0	—		7	0	—		65	0
Bruk-Bet Termalica	2017–18	Ekstraklasa	27	0	1	0	—		0	0	0	0	28	0
Hamilton Academical	2018–19	Scottish Premiership	2	0	—		—		—		—		2	0
Career total			211	0	26	0	7	0	16	0	4	0	264	0

=== International ===
Appearances and goals by national team and year
National team	Year	Apps	Goals
Slovakia	2008	4	0
Slovakia	2009	9	0
Slovakia	2010	12	0
Slovakia	2011	7	0
Slovakia	2012	3	0
Slovakia	2013	4	0
Slovakia	2014	3	0
Slovakia	2015	2	0
Slovakia	2016	2	0
Total		46	0

== Honours ==
Žilina

- Slovak First Football League: 2002–03, 2003–04
- Slovak Super Cup: 2004

Legia Warsaw

- Polish Cup: 2007–08
- Polish Super Cup: 2008

Slovan Bratislava

- Slovak Cup: 2016–17

Individual

- Ekstraklasa Player of the Month: November 2009
- Piłka Nożna Foreigner of the Year: 2009
