= Magaye Gueye =

Senegalese-French footballer (born 1990)

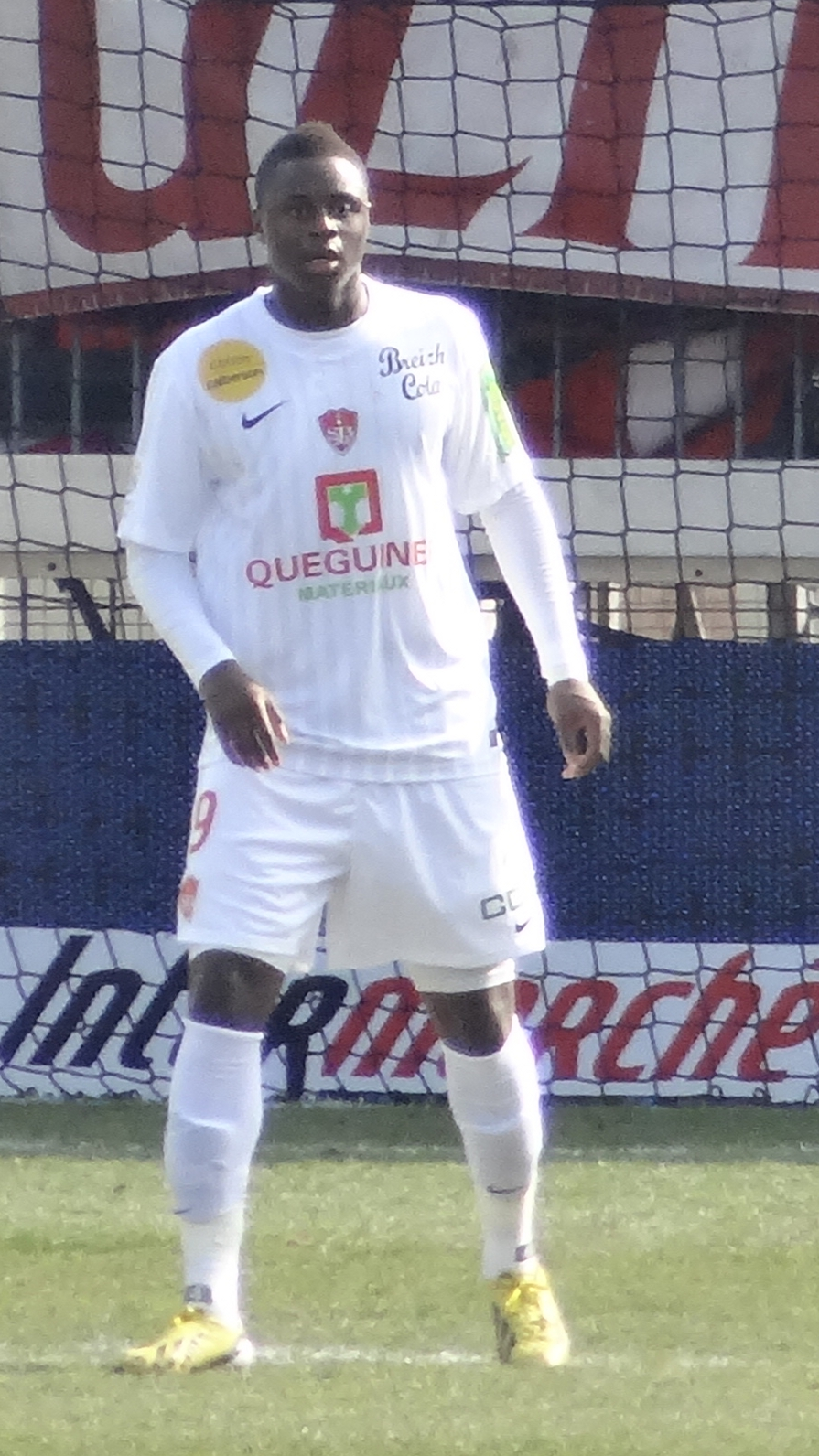
- Gueye playing for Brest in 2013

Personal information
- Full name: Magaye Serigne Falilou Gueye
- Date of birth: 6 July 1990 (age 36)
- Place of birth: Nogent-sur-Marne, France
- Height: 1.83 m (6 ft 0 in)
- Position: Forward

Youth career
- 1999–2002: US Lognes
- 2002–2008: Strasbourg

Senior career*
Years	Team	Apps	(Gls)
2008–2010	Strasbourg	27	(9)
2010–2014	Everton	24	(1)
2013	→ Brest (loan)	7	(0)
2014–2015	Millwall	32	(5)
2015–2018	Adanaspor	86	(26)
2018–2019	Osmanlıspor	25	(9)
2019–2020	Qarabağ	18	(5)
2020–2021	Dinamo București	18	(3)
2022	Anagennisi Karditsa	3	(0)

International career
2005	France U16	1	(1)
2008–2009	France U19	15	(6)
2010	France U20	3	(1)
2009–2011	France U21	8	(2)
2012	Senegal U23	3	(0)
- * Club domestic league appearances and goals

Magaye Serigne Falilou Gueye (born 6 July 1990) is a former professional footballer who played as a forward. A former French youth and under-21 international, in 2012 he switched to play for the Senegal U23s.

== Club career ==
=== Strasbourg ===
Gueye was born in Nogent-sur-Marne to Senegalese parents and began his career in the Île-de-France region playing for local club US Lognes in the eastern suburbs of Paris. He was a talented sprinter but stopped to focus on his football career. His 100m personal best remains 10.13s. In 2002, at the age of 12, he joined the youth academy of RC Strasbourg. Gueye quickly progressed through the youth ranks, where he helped the under-18 squad reach the semi-finals of the 2008 Coupe Gambardella. For the 2008–09 season, he was promoted to the club's Championnat de France amateur team, appearing in 13 matches and scoring two goals. He also assisted on three goals. On 30 October, Gueye signed his first professional contract, agreeing to a three-year deal until June 2012. He was officially promoted to the senior team and assigned the number 4 shirt.

Gueye made his professional debut on 3 November 2008 in the club's league match against Lens appearing as a substitute for the Brazilian Marcos in a 1–1 draw. He made his first career start several months later on 10 April 2009, this time in a 4–1 defeat to Lens. Gueye switched to the number 8 shirt for the 2009–10 season and scored his first professional goal in the club's first match of the season against Istres in the Coupe de la Ligue. However, Strasbourg lost the match 6–1. He continued his streak of proficient goalscoring by scoring a goal in each of the club's first five league matches against Châteauroux, Laval, Arles-Avignon, Ajaccio, and Sedan. Gueye later suffered a severe groin injury and missed both November and December.

Following the winter break, he returned to the team and in his first match back, he provided the assist for Strasbourg's only goal in their 3–1 loss to Olympique Lyonnais in the Coupe de France. However, later in the match, Gueye suffered an injury to his knee. The injury was, initially, diagnosed as torn ligaments, however, after further medical analysis, it was reduced to only a sprain. Gueye missed six weeks, as opposed to six months had he torn the ligaments.

=== Everton ===
In June 2010, Gueye joined English club Everton, signing a five-year contract, for a fee of £1m. He made his début in a 1–0 victory over Sydney FC on a pre-season tour of Australia the following month. Gueye scored his first goal for the club in a 2–1 victory over Brisbane Roar a week later. He made his competitive début for the Blues in their first League Cup match of the 2010–11 season, starting on the field in a 5–1 victory over Huddersfield Town. His first league appearance for Everton came on 2 April 2011, as a substitute for Séamus Coleman in a 2–2 draw against Aston Villa. His first Premier League start was in a 3–0 win against Wolves on 9 April 2011. Gueye was influential in Everton's FA Cup quarter-final replay victory at Sunderland on 27 March 2012, assisting Nikica Jelavic for Everton's first of the game and securing the club's third appearance at Wembley Stadium in as many years. On 9 April 2012, Gueye's first Premier League goal came in a 4–0 win over Sunderland, smashing in the opener from a rebound from a Leon Osman effort. He also made two assists in the match. He scored his only goal of the 2012–13 season on 29 August 2012, volleying in a Séamus Coleman cross in a League Cup second round tie at home to Leyton Orient. In January 2014 he scored his third and final goal for Everton in the FA Cup against Stevenage, in what was his only appearance of the 2013-14 season. On 13 June 2014, Gueye left the club by mutual consent.

=== Stade Brestois 29 ===
In January 2013, Gueye joined French club Brest on loan for the rest of the 2012–13 season. He made his debut on 9 February 2013 against Valenciennes but could not prevent a 2–1 loss for Brest. Gueye made a total of eight appearances for the club.

=== Millwall ===
Gueye joined Millwall on 25 July 2014 on a one-year contract with an option for a further 12 months. He scored his first goal for the Lions against Sheffield Wednesday, denying the hosts victory in the 94th minute. Gueye left the club in July 2015 after his contract wasn't renewed.

=== Qarabağ ===
On 17 July 2019, Gueye signed a two-year contract with Qarabağ FK. On 6 August 2019, Gueye scored his first goal for Qarabağ FK against APOEL at third qualifying round of 2019–20 UEFA Champions League. On 8 June 2020, Qarabağ announced that Gueye had left the club by mutual consent.

=== Dinamo București ===
On 7 October 2020, Gueye signed a two-year contract with Dinamo București. He made his debut for the second Dinamo team, scoring two goals. For the first team, he played his first match on 18 October when he came on in the 74th minute during a match against Universitatea Craiova, a 0–1 home defeat. He scored his first goal for Dinamo in a match against Astra Giurgiu, with a bicycle kick. In March 2021, after Dinamo - FCSB, Gueye underwent an anti-doping test and was said to have used cocaine. Thus, he was fired by Dinamo.

== International career ==
=== France ===
Gueye featured with the under-16 team early on during his development, but appeared with neither the under-17s nor the under-18s in competition. He returned with the under-19 team making his debut in an under-19 tournament held in Denmark. He participated with the team in the qualification for the 2009 UEFA European Under-19 Football Championship scoring goals against Malta and Latvia. In the tournament, he scored the team's only goal in their 3–1 loss to England in the semi-finals. On 27 August, he was called up to the under-21 team for their 2011 UEFA European Under-21 Football Championship qualification matches against Slovenia and Ukraine. He earned his first under-21 cap in the match against Slovenia appearing as a substitute. On 12 May 2010, Gueye was called up to the under-20 team by coach Patrick Gonfalone to participate in the 2010 Toulon Tournament. In the team's second group stage match against Japan, he scored the second goal, converting a penalty, in the team's 4–1 victory.

=== Senegal ===
In June 2012, Gueye completed paperwork to become eligible to represent Senegal internationally. The following month, he accepted a call-up from Joseph Koto and was named in Senegal's Olympic squad for London 2012 Summer Olympics football tournament.

== Honours ==
Adanaspor

- TFF 1. Lig: 2015–16

Qarabağ FK

- Azerbaijan Premier League: 2019–20
