= 2010–11 Everton F.C. season =

English football club season

Everton
2010–11 season
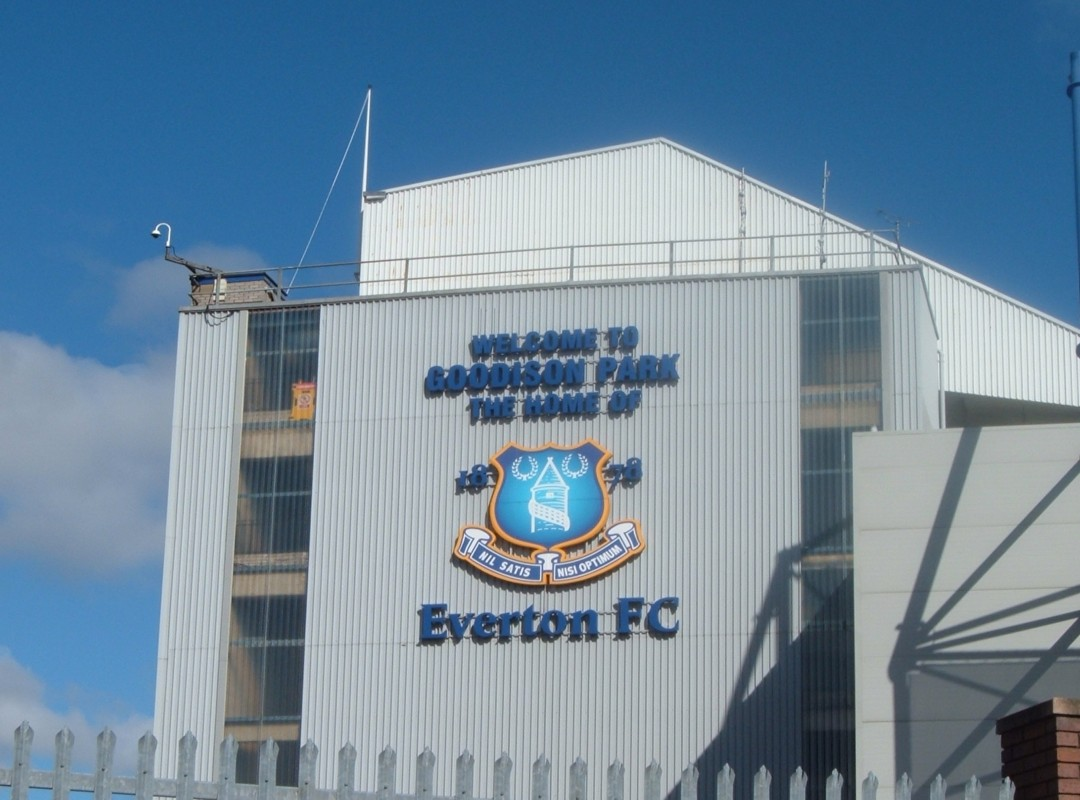
- Goodison Park
- Chairman: Bill Kenwright
- Manager: David Moyes
- Premier League: 7th
- FA Cup: Fifth round
- League Cup: Third round
- Top goalscorer: League: Tim Cahill (9); All: Jermaine Beckford, Louis Saha (10)
- Highest home attendance: 40,127 (22 May v. Chelsea)
- Lowest home attendance: 28,376 (29 Jan v. Chelsea)
- Average home league attendance: League: 36,113; All: 35,154
Home colours	Away colours	Third colours

The 2010–11 season of Everton F.C. was Everton's 19th season in the Premier League and 57th consecutive season in the top division of English football. It was also Everton's 112th season of league football and 114th season in all competitions. The club began their pre-season friendly schedule on 10 July 2010 with a 3-match tour of Australia. Also, for the first time in club history, Everton played against and defeated their namesake, Chilean club Everton de Viña del Mar, 2–0 in a friendly at Goodison Park. The club entered the Football League Cup in the second round against Huddersfield Town and were knocked out in the subsequent round in a surprise away defeat to Brentford. Everton entered the FA Cup in the third round proper and were eliminated in the fifth round by Reading. The club's Premier League campaign began on 14 August against Blackburn Rovers at Ewood Park and concluded on 22 May against Chelsea at Goodison Park. For the first time since 2006–07, Everton did not participate in any European competitions.

== Kit ==
Supplier: Le Coq Sportif / Sponsor: Chang beer

Home	Home alt.	Home alt. 2

Away	Away alt.	Third

Goalkeeper 1	Goalkeeper 2

=== Kit information ===
The new home kit for the 2010-11 season was very plain - the large white 'V' on the collar and the trimmings were omitted. The away kit was, in contrast to the home kit, in a dazzling shade of 'lightning pink' with an indigo block on the upper chest. The third kit was officially called 'vanilla' with indigo shorts. There were two goalkeeper kits; the home version was in three tones of green; the other kit was mostly black with a yellow and white chest panel.

== Matches ==
=== Pre-season friendlies ===
On 30 April 2010, Everton confirmed on their official website that they would tour Australia as part of their pre-season preparation for their 2010–11 Premier League campaign. Everton announced on 23 June that they will conclude their pre-season against Wolfsburg on 7 August.

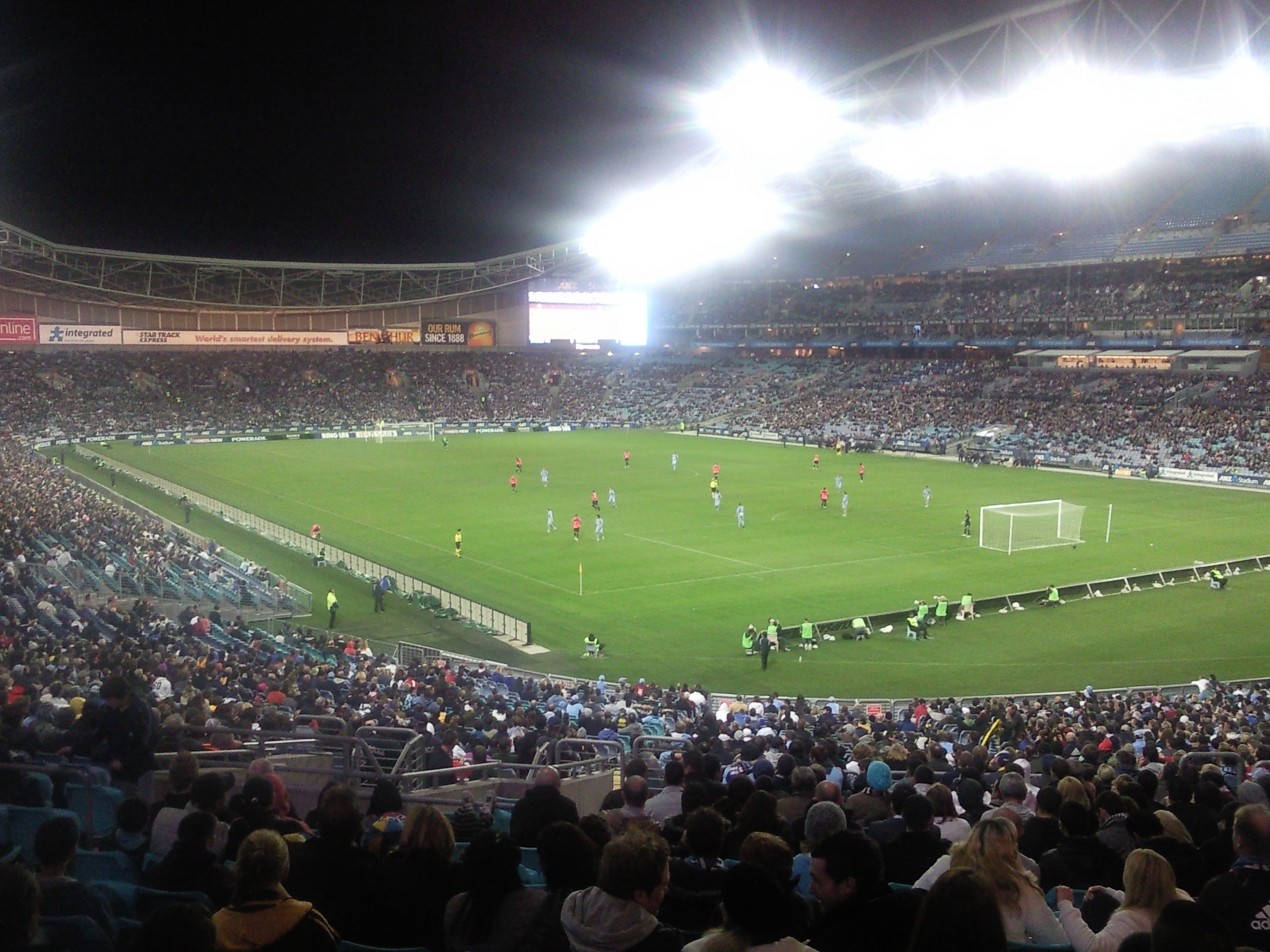
Sydney FC v Everton, 10 July 2010

Everton won the first match of the Australian tour, 1–0, over Sydney FC. In front of 40,446 spectators at Stadium Australia, the Toffees' new "lightning pink" away strips made their on-pitch debut as Victor Anichebe scored the lone goal of the match in the 46th minute. Everton continued their pre-season success with a 2–0 victory over Melbourne Heart. Recent signings Jermaine Beckford and João Silva made their Everton debuts as Jack Rodwell and Louis Saha scored. In the third and final match of the "Everton Down Under" tour, the Toffees completed the three-match sweep of Australian clubs, beating Brisbane Roar 2–1. Rodwell scored for the second game in a row, and recent transfer Magaye Gueye scored his first for the Blues.

Everton made their return to home soil with a 3–0 win away to Preston North End. Everton scored all three goals in the second half, two from Beckford and another from Saha. The toffees won their fifth consecutive pre-season friendly with a 4–2 victory at Norwich City that featured a Tim Cahill hat-trick. Cahill scored a brace in the first half for the 2–0 lead at the break. Norwich tied the game with goals in the 46th and 58th minutes. However, Diniyar Bilyaletdinov scored in the 59th minute, and Cahill notched his third of the day in the 71st to secure the victory. Everton's next match – their only match at Goodison during the entire pre-season – was a 2–0 victory for the Brotherhood Cup over their namesake, Chilean club Everton de Viña del Mar. Everton's goals both came in the second half, one each from Beckford and Bilyaletdinov, and referee Mark Halsey made his return to a welcoming crowd following his year-long hiatus from football due to a bout with lymphoma. The match featured several firsts. It was the first time that a Chilean club had ever been invited to play a match in Europe, and it was also the first time that Everton had ever faced one of their namesake clubs, which also exist in Argentina and Uruguay. Everton suffered their first loss of the pre-season in their final summer friendly, 2–0, away to German club Wolfsburg. Wolfsburg outplayed Everton throughout the match and went into the break with both goals already scored, one each from Mario Mandžukić and Karim Ziani.

10 July	Sydney FC	0–1	Everton	Sydney
20:00 UTC+10		Report	Anichebe 46'	Stadium: ANZ Stadium; Attendance: 40,466; Referee: Strebre Delovski

14 July	Melbourne Heart	0–2	Everton	Melbourne, Australia
20:00 UTC+10		Report	Rodwell 34'; Saha 60'	Stadium: Etihad Stadium; Attendance: 19,241; Referee: Matthew Breeze

17 July	Brisbane Roar	1–2	Everton	Brisbane, Australia
18:30 UTC+10	Barbarouses 66'	Report	Rodwell 49'; Gueye 83'	Stadium: Suncorp Stadium; Attendance: 19,786; Referee: Peter Green

24 July	Preston North End	0–3	Everton	Preston
15:00		Report	Beckford 56', 70'; Saha 67'	Stadium: Deepdale Stadium; Attendance: 9,153; Referee: Jon Moss

31 July	Norwich City	2–4	Everton	Norwich
15:00	Crofts 46'; Surman 58'	Report	Cahill 6', 38', 71'; Bilyaletdinov 59'	Stadium: Carrow Road; Attendance: 13,446; Referee: Grant Hegley

4 August	Everton	2–0	Everton de Viña del Mar	Liverpool
20:00	Beckford 51'; Bilyaletdinov 65'	Report		Stadium: Goodison Park; Attendance: 25,934; Referee: Mark Halsey

7 August	Wolfsburg	2–0	Everton	Wolfsburg, Germany
17:00 CET	Mandžukić 17'; Ziani 38'	Report		Stadium: Volkswagen Arena; Attendance: 13,707; Referee: Florian Meyer

=== Premier League ===
==== August ====
Everton opened their season on 14 August at Ewood Park, falling 1–0 to Blackburn Rovers. In the fourteenth minute, goalkeeper Tim Howard mishandled the ball, dropping it at the feet of Nikola Kalinić, who put the ball in the net. Following the game, manager David Moyes came to the defence of Howard, saying that the team's lack of attacking pressure from the forwards and midfielders were equally to blame for the loss. Everton's second match saw the club earn their first point of the season in a 1–1 draw with Wolverhampton Wanderers at Goodison Park. Everton controlled possession and had more chances throughout much of the first half – Wolves manager Mick McCarthy going so far a saying that Wolves were "hopeless in the first half" – but a 43rd-minute goal by Tim Cahill was the only score of the first half. Wolves' 4–4–2 formation was scrapped by McCarthy in the second half in favour of a 4–5–1, which resulted in a more closely contested match. Wolves got the equaliser off the foot of Sylvan Ebanks-Blake, who tapped in a cross from Kevin Doyle during a fast break in the 74th minute. Everton's third match of the season saw the Toffees drop three points to Aston Villa, losing 1–0. Everton held advantages in possession and corner kicks earned, 68%–32% and 18–4, respectively, but were unable to turn their offensive pressure into a goal. Villa's goal came in the ninth minute when right back Luke Young charged up the center of the field and finished a pass from Ashley Young for his first goal in 22 months. With only one point through three matches, it marked Everton's worst start in a league season in over a decade.

==== September ====
Everton's Premier League campaign resumed on 12 September against Manchester United at Goodison Park, following an international break for UEFA Euro 2012 qualifying. Wayne Rooney was notably not in United's squad; Sir Alex Ferguson held him out of the line-up to spare him from verbal abuse from Everton fans in regards to a recent personal allegation. Steven Pienaar opened the scoring in the 39th minute. United, however, scored the next three goals – one apiece from Darren Fletcher, Nemanja Vidić, and Dimitar Berbatov – for a 3–1 lead. Ultimately, though, the Toffees were able to salvage a point by scoring two injury time goals, first by Cahill and then by Mikel Arteta, for the 3–3 draw. Everton dropped the full three points to their next opponent, Newcastle United, losing 1–0 on a Hatem Ben Arfa goal scored just before half-time. In Everton's final match of September, the club travelled to Craven Cottage and went home with a single point following a 0–0 draw with Fulham. The draw left Everton at the bottom of the Premier League table and as the only club in the top four divisions of English football without a league win.

==== October ====
Everton began October at St Andrew's and came away with their first league win of the season, a 2–0 victory over Birmingham City, whose top-flight club record of 18 undefeated home matches came to an end. The Toffees dominated possession and chances throughout much of the game, though the club's first away goal of the season continued to prove elusive until Roger Johnson knocked in an own goal to put Everton ahead in the 54th minute. A Tim Cahill header sealed the victory in added time. After the international break, Everton hosted Liverpool in the 214th Merseyside Derby. Liverpool's new owners, John W. Henry and Tom Werner, attended the match mere days after buying the club. Despite having less possession and less shots on target, Everton won the match 2–0 with goals from Tim Cahill, who became Everton's highest post-War, Merseyside derby goalscorer, in the first half and Mikel Arteta with a strike from just outside the 18-yard box in the second half. The following week Everton travelled to White Hart Lane to face Tottenham. Everton took the lead in the 17th minute after Leighton Baines converted a free-kick following Younès Kaboul's foul on Yakubu on the edge of the 18-yard box. Everton's lead was short lived however with Spurs levelling three minutes later after Tim Howard's goalkeeping error gifted Rafael van der Vaart a tap-in finish. Everton next faced Stoke at Goodison with the knowledge that a victory would see them rise into the top half of the Premier League table. After a goalless first half, Yakubu scored the only goal of the match in the 67th minute with a left-footed finish after Tim Cahill's shot hit the woodwork, handing Everton the win and also breaking his own six-month goal drought. Everton's successful form in October – three wins and one draw – turned their season around, and led to David Moyes being awarded the Manager of the Month award.

==== November ====
Everton's first match in November was against Blackpool at Bloomfield Road. Everton twice came from a goal down as the match ended in a 2–2 draw. Tim Cahill scored with a header, his 50th Premier League goal, three minutes after Neal Eardley gave the hosts the lead. Séamus Coleman then scored his first Premier League goal for Everton in the second half following David Vaughan's strike two minutes earlier. Everton then hosted Bolton mid-week. Everton dominated possession and shots for much of the match, however they went behind in the 79th minute after Ivan Klasnić's goal. Six minutes later Marouane Fellaini was sent off, in his first match after returning from injury, after lashing out at Paul Robinson after the latter's tackle. It appeared that the result would not go Everton's way, however substitute Jermaine Beckford ensured Everton would earn a point after his strike, which met the top corner of the net from the left side of the penalty area, in the fourth minute of extra time. This result stretched Everton's unbeaten run in the Premier League to seven matches. Everton then hosted Arsenal, having lost the previous season's corresponding fixture 1–6, Everton were looking to improve on this result. Jack Rodwell played in his first match after injury, substituting on at half time, in a losing effort for the home side. Everton conceded a goal either side of half-time to Bacary Sagna and Cesc Fàbregas, before Tim Cahill got one back two minutes from full-time. With the end result being 1–2, Everton lost their first league match since September. Everton's next match was a Monday night fixture away against Sunderland at the Stadium of Light, Everton took an early lead after Tim Cahill found the net from Leighton Baines' cross. Sunderland's, Manchester United loanee, Danny Welbeck then scored a goal either side of half-time to give Sunderland a 2 – 1 lead. Mikel Arteta then equalised with a strike from 20 yards that deflected off Phil Bardsley, Jermaine Beckford then had an injury-time chance to win the game for Everton but was unable to convert when one-on-one with Sunderland goalkeeper Craig Gordon. The following week Everton hosted West Brom, Everton found themselves down two goals inside with 30 minutes after Paul Scharner's strike and Chris Brunt's 30-yard free kick. Tim Cahill then scored his eighth goal of the season with a close range header from Leighton Baines' assist, it was the sixth time that Baines and Cahill had combined for a Cahill goal in the season. Mikel Arteta was then dismissed for violent conduct, before Somen Tchoyi put West Brom up 3 – 1 soon after Sylvain Distin scored an own goal to close the match out for the Baggies, the only sour note for West Brom was the late sending off of Youssuf Mulumbu after his second bookable offence in as many minutes.

==== Results ====
14 August	Blackburn Rovers	1–0	Everton	Blackburn
15:00 BST	Kalinić 14'; Salgado (yellow card) 71'	Report	Cahill (yellow card) 64'	Stadium: Ewood Park; Attendance: 25,869; Referee: Phil Dowd

21 August	Everton	1–1	Wolverhampton Wanderers	Liverpool
15:00 BST	Cahill 43'; Heitinga (yellow card) 77'	Report	Elokobi (yellow card) 35'; Ebanks-Blake 74'	Stadium: Goodison Park; Attendance: 37,767; Referee: Lee Mason

29 August	Aston Villa	1–0	Everton	Birmingham
16:00 BST	L. Young 9'; Dunne (yellow card) 12'; Collins (yellow card) 60'; Albrighton (yellow card) 62'; Petrov (yellow card) 80'	Report		Stadium: Villa Park; Attendance: 34,725; Referee: Mike Jones

11 September	Everton	3–3	Manchester United	Liverpool
13:30 BST	Pienaar 39'; Heitinga (yellow card) 51'; Cahill 90+1'; Arteta 90+2'	Report	Fletcher 43'; Giggs (yellow card) 44'; Vidić 47'; Berbatov 66'	Stadium: Goodison Park; Attendance: 36,556; Referee: Martin Atkinson

18 September	Everton	0–1	Newcastle United	Liverpool
15:00 BST	Beckford (yellow card) 33'; Fellaini (yellow card) 63'	Report	Ben Arfa 45'; Perch (yellow card) 59'; José Enrique (yellow card) 67'; Nolan (yellow card) 69'	Stadium: Goodison Park; Attendance: 38,019; Referee: Andre Marriner

25 September	Fulham	0–0	Everton	London
15:00 BST	Salcido (yellow card) 80'; Duff (yellow card) 86'		Pienaar (yellow card) 76'	Stadium: Craven Cottage; Attendance: 25,598; Referee: Howard Webb

2 October	Birmingham City	0–2	Everton	Birmingham
15:00 BST		Report	Johnson 54' (o.g.); Cahill 90+3'	Stadium: St. Andrew's; Attendance: 23,138; Referee: Phil Dowd

17 October	Everton	2–0	Liverpool	Liverpool
13:30 BST	Cahill (yellow card) 28', (goal) 34'; Arteta 50'; Beckford (yellow card) 76'	Report	Rodríguez (yellow card) 18'; Meireles (yellow card) 31'; Torres (yellow card) 87'	Stadium: Goodison Park; Attendance: 39,673; Referee: Howard Webb

23 October	Tottenham Hotspur	1–1	Everton	London
12:45 BST	Palacios (yellow card) 10'; Van der Vaart 20', (yellow card) 74'		Baines 17'; Coleman (yellow card) 51'	Stadium: White Hart Lane; Attendance: 35,967; Referee: Mike Jones

30 October	Everton	1–0	Stoke City	Liverpool
15:00 BST	Baines (yellow card) 63'; Yakubu 67'	Report	Wilson (yellow card) 61'	Stadium: Goodison Park; Attendance: 35,513; Referee: Lee Probert

6 November	Blackpool	2–2	Everton	Blackpool
15:00 GMT	Eardley 10', (yellow card) 22'; Crainey (yellow card) 37'; Vaughan 48'	Report	Cahill 13'; Coleman 50'; Jagielka (yellow card) 90+1'	Stadium: Bloomfield Road; Attendance: 16,094; Referee: André Marriner

10 November	Everton	1–1	Bolton Wanderers	Liverpool
19:45 GMT	Fellaini (red card) 86'; Beckford 90+4'	Report	Steinsson (yellow card) 39'; Knight (yellow card) 45+1'; Klasnić 79'	Stadium: Goodison Park; Attendance: 31,808; Referee: Phil Dowd

14 November	Everton	1–2	Arsenal	Liverpool
14:00 GMT	Heitinga (yellow card) 26'; Cahill 89'; Coleman (yellow card) 90+3'	Report	Sagna 36'; Fàbregas 48', (yellow card) 51'; Squillaci (yellow card) 49'	Stadium: Goodison Park; Attendance: 36,270; Referee: Howard Webb

22 November	Sunderland	2–2	Everton	Sunderland
20:00 GMT	Welbeck 23', 70'	Report	Cahill 6'; Heitinga (yellow card) 18'; Rodwell (yellow card) 74'; Arteta 83'	Stadium: Stadium of Light; Attendance: 37,331; Referee: Peter Walton

27 November	Everton	1–4	West Bromwich Albion	Liverpool
15:00 GMT	Cahill 42'; Arteta (red card) 58'; Beckford (yellow card) 83'	Report	Scharner 16'; Brunt 26', (yellow card) 31'; Dorrans (yellow card) 71'; Tchoyi 76'; Distin 87' (o.g.); Mulumbu (yellow card) 88' (yellow-red card) 89'	Stadium: Goodison Park; Attendance: 35,237; Referee: Lee Mason

4 December	Chelsea	1–1	Everton	London
15:00 GMT	Drogba 42' (pen.); Terry (yellow card) 76'	Report	Neville (yellow card) 29'; Howard (yellow card) 41'; Coleman (yellow card) 76'; Beckford 86'; Jagielka (yellow card) 90+2'	Stadium: Stamford Bridge; Attendance: 41,642; Referee: Lee Probert

11 December	Everton	0–0	Wigan Athletic	Liverpool
15:00 GMT	Neville (yellow card) 7'; Pienaar (yellow card) 27'	Report	Thomas (yellow card) 30'; Gohouri (yellow card) 80'; Figueroa (yellow card) 90'; N'Zogbia (yellow card) 90+5'	Stadium: Goodison Park; Attendance: 32,853; Referee: Michael Oliver

20 December	Manchester City	1–2	Everton	Manchester
15:00 GMT	Kompany (yellow card) 23'; Jagielka 72' (o.g.); Barry (yellow card) 90+1'; K. Touré (yellow card) 90+3' (yellow-red card) 90+4'	Report	Cahill 4'; Baines 19'; Fellaini (yellow card) 34'; Anichebe (yellow card) 55' (yellow-red card) 60'	Stadium: City of Manchester Stadium; Attendance: 45,028; Referee: Peter Walton

Postponed	Everton	P – P	Birmingham City	Liverpool
15:00 GMT				Stadium: Goodison Park

28 December	West Ham United	1–1	Everton	London
15:00 GMT	Hibbert 16' (o.g.); Kováč (yellow card) 65'	Report	Coleman 42'	Stadium: Upton Park; Attendance: 33,422; Referee: Howard Webb

1 January	Stoke City	2–0	Everton	Stoke-on-Trent
15:00 GMT	Collins (yellow card) 13'; Jones 23'; Begović (yellow card) 31'; Whitehead (yellow card) 48'; Delap (yellow card) 57'; Jagielka 69' (o.g.)	Report	Cahill (yellow card) 69'	Stadium: Britannia Stadium; Attendance: 27,418; Referee: Andre Marriner

5 January	Everton	2–1	Tottenham Hotspur	Liverpool
20:00 GMT	Saha 3'; Neville (yellow card) 57'; Coleman 75'	Report	Van der Vaart 11'	Stadium: Goodison Park; Attendance: 34,124; Referee: Lee Probert

16 January	Liverpool	2–2	Everton	Liverpool
15:00 GMT	Meireles 29'; Reina (yellow card) 53'; Torres (yellow card) 63'; Kuyt 68' (pen.), (yellow card) 89'	Report	Distin 46'; Beckford 52'	Stadium: Anfield; Attendance: 44,795; Referee: Phil Dowd

22 January	Everton	2–2	West Ham United	Liverpool
15:00 GMT	Fellaini (yellow card) 42', (goal) 90'; Bilyaletdinov 77'	Report	Spector 26'; Parker (yellow card) 32'; Piquionne (yellow card) 82' (yellow-red card) 85', (goal) 84'	Stadium: Goodison Park; Attendance: 34,179; Referee: Peter Walton

1 February	Arsenal	2–1	Everton	London
19:45 GMT	Wilshere (yellow card) 5'; Rosický (yellow card) 45'; Van Persie (yellow card) 60'; Arshavin 70'; Koscielny 75'	Report	Distin (yellow card) 14'; Saha 24'; Rodwell (yellow card) 46'; Arteta (yellow card) 59'; Howard (yellow card) 71'; Osman (yellow card) 74'	Stadium: Emirates Stadium; Attendance: 60,014; Referee: Lee Mason

5 February	Everton	5–3	Blackpool	Liverpool
15:00 GMT	Saha 20', 47', 76', 84'; Beckford 80'	Report	Baptiste 37'; Puncheon 62'; Adam (yellow card) 50', (goal) 64'	Stadium: Goodison Park; Attendance: 38,202; Referee: Kevin Friend

13 February	Bolton Wanderers	2–0	Everton	Horwich
13:00 GMT	G. Cahill 10'; Elmander (yellow card) 12'; Sturridge 67'	Report		Stadium: Reebok Stadium; Attendance: 22,986; Referee: Lee Probert

26 February	Everton	2–0	Sunderland	Liverpool
16:00 GMT	Beckford 8', 39'	Report		Stadium: Goodison Park; Attendance: 37,776; Referee: Stuart Attwell

5 March	Newcastle United	1–2	Everton	Newcastle upon Tyne
15:00 GMT	Best 23'; S. Taylor (yellow card) 39'; Nolan (yellow card) 76'	Report	Hibbert (yellow card) 25'; Osman 31'; Jagielka 36'; Anichebe (yellow card) 75'; Heitinga (yellow card) 82'; Baines (yellow card) 83'	Stadium: St James' Park; Attendance: 50,128; Referee: Howard Webb

9 March	Everton	1–1	Birmingham City	Liverpool
20:00 GMT	Heitinga 35', (yellow card) 54'	Report	Beausejour 17'; Mutch (yellow card) 40'; Ridgewell (yellow card) 48'; Murphy (yellow card) 81'	Stadium: Goodison Park; Attendance: 33,974; Referee: Peter Walton

19 March	Everton	2–1	Fulham	Liverpool
15:00 GMT	Coleman 36'; Saha 49'; Osman (yellow card) 55'; Hibbert (yellow card) 63'	Report	Dempsey 62'	Stadium: Goodison Park; Attendance: 33,239; Referee: Michael Oliver

2 April	Everton	2–2	Aston Villa	Liverpool
15:00 GMT	Heitinga (yellow card) 33'; Jagielka (yellow card) 35'; Osman 38' (yellow card) 84'; Baines 82' (pen.)	Report	Bent 47', 68'; Makoun (yellow card) 49'; Walker (yellow card) 70'	Stadium: Goodison Park; Attendance: 37,619; Referee: Mike Jones

9 April	Wolverhampton Wanderers	0–3	Everton	Wolverhampton
15:00 GMT		Report	Beckford 21'; Neville 39'; Bilyaletdinov 45', (yellow card) 52'	Stadium: Molineux Stadium; Attendance: 28,352; Referee: Phil Dowd

16 April	Everton	2–0	Blackburn Rovers	Liverpool
15:00 BST	Baines (yellow card) 26', (goal) 75' (pen.); Osman 54'; Rodwell (yellow card) 90+1'	Report	Dunn (yellow card) 25'; Rochina (yellow card) 71'; Jones (yellow card) 73'	Stadium: Goodison Park; Attendance: 35,857; Referee: Kevin Friend

23 April	Manchester United	1–0	Everton	Manchester
15:00 BST	Anderson (yellow card) 54'; Hernández 84'	Report	Cahill (yellow card) 55'; Howard (yellow card) 82'	Stadium: Old Trafford; Attendance: 75,300; Referee: Peter Walton

30 April	Wigan Athletic	1–1	Everton	Wigan
15:00 BST	N'Zogbia 21'; Diamé (yellow card) 41'; Figueroa (yellow card) 87'	Report	Hibbert (yellow card) 58'; Baines 78' (pen.); Rodwell (yellow card) 82'	Stadium: DW Stadium; Attendance: 17,051; Referee: Lee Mason

7 May	Everton	2–1	Manchester City	Liverpool
15:00 BST	Neville (yellow card) 45'; Rodwell (yellow card) 61'; Distin 65'; Osman (yellow card) 67', (goal) 72'; Coleman (yellow card) 90+1'	Report	Y. Touré 28'; Kompany (yellow card) 60'; Kolarov (yellow card) 71'	Stadium: Goodison Park; Attendance: 37,351; Referee: Phil Dowd

14 May	West Bromwich Albion	1–0	Everton	West Bromwich
15:00 BST	Mulumbu 10'; Thomas (yellow card) 62'; Tamaș (yellow card) 90'	Report	Neville (yellow card) 49'; Heitinga (yellow card) 64'; Bilyaletdinov (red card) 77'	Stadium: The Hawthorns; Attendance: 25,838; Referee: Anthony Taylor

22 May	Everton	1–0	Chelsea	Liverpool
16:00 BST	Heitinga (yellow card) 26'; Coleman (yellow card) 47' (yellow-red card) 53'; Baines (yellow card) 50'; Beckford 74'	Report	Alex (yellow card) 51'; Torres (yellow card) 90+2'	Stadium: Goodison Park; Attendance: 40,127; Referee: Mike Jones

=== League Cup ===
Everton entered the Football League Cup in the second round and were drawn against Huddersfield Town, 1–0 winners over Carlisle United in the first round. Everton made fairly easy work of Huddersfield in a 5–1 victory with goals from Marouane Fellaini, Jack Rodwell, Jermaine Beckford, Louis Saha, and Leon Osman. The Terriers cut it to within a goal in the 40th minute on a John Heitinga own-goal, but Beckford restored the two-goal lead and scored his first competitive goal for Everton from the penalty spot in the 50th minute. Huddersfield's Lee Peltier was sent off for receiving his second yellow card in the 71st minute, essentially eliminating the possibility of a comeback. Everton's third-round match was against League One club Brentford. David Moyes started a near-full strength side as the Toffees went down 4–3 on penalties after a 1–1 draw through extra time. Séamus Coleman opened the scoring in the sixth minute, but the team was unable to finish its chances throughout the rest of the match. Brentford were able to draw even shortly before the half when Gary Alexander struck in the 41st minute. Ján Mucha, filling in for regular starter Tim Howard, saved a second half penalty but was unable to stop any of the four shootout chances following a scoreless extra time. After Leighton Baines, Phil Neville, and Mikel Arteta scored in the shootout, Jermaine Beckford was saved and Phil Jagielka hit the bar to seal the win for Brentford, whose fans flooded the pitch in celebration.

25 August Second round	Everton	5–1	Huddersfield Town	Liverpool
20:00 BST	Fellaini 6'; Rodwell 13'; Beckford 49' (pen.); Saha 76'; Osman 84'	Report	Heitinga 39' (o.g.); Peltier (yellow card) 51' (yellow-red card) 71'; Roberts (yellow card) 80'	Stadium: Goodison Park; Attendance: 28,901; Referee: Neil Swarbrick

21 September Third round	Brentford	1 – 1 (a.e.t.) (4–3 p)	Everton	London
19:45 BST	Alexander 41'	Report	Coleman 6', (yellow card) 58'; Fellaini (yellow card) 84'	Stadium: Griffin Park; Attendance: 8,960; Referee: Michael Oliver
	Penalties
	Weston (penalty scored); Forster (penalty scored); Spillane (penalty scored); MacDonald (penalty scored)		(penalty scored) Baines; (penalty scored) Neville; (penalty scored) Arteta; (penalty missed) Beckford; (penalty missed) Jagielka

=== FA Cup ===
Everton enter the FA Cup in the third round, Everton drew Scunthorpe United on 28 November 2010. It was only the third meeting between the two teams after Everton won a two-legged League Cup tie 6–0 in the Second round of the 1997–98 Football League Cup.

8 January Third round	Scunthorpe United	1–5	Everton	Scunthorpe
15:00 GMT	Collins 46'	Report	Saha 4'; Heitinga (yellow card) 9'; Beckford 33'; Coleman 58', (yellow card) 58'; Fellaini 73'; Baines 83'	Stadium: Glanford Park; Attendance: 7,028; Referee: Kevin Friend

29 January Fourth round	Everton	1–1	Chelsea	Liverpool
12:30 GMT	Saha 62'	Report	Kalou 75'	Stadium: Goodison Park; Attendance: 28,376; Referee: Howard Webb

19 February Fourth round replay	Chelsea	1 – 1 (a.e.t.) (3–4 p)	Everton	London
20:00 GMT	Malouda (yellow card) 43'; Ramires (yellow card) 45+1'; Lampard 104'	Report	Baines (yellow card) 51', (goal) 119'; Coleman (yellow card) 53'; Distin (yellow card) 60'; Arteta (yellow card) 113'	Stadium: Stamford Bridge; Attendance: 41,113; Referee: Phil Dowd
	Penalties
	Lampard (penalty scored); Drogba (penalty scored); Anelka (penalty missed); Essien (penalty scored); Cole (penalty missed)		(penalty missed) Baines; (penalty scored) Jagielka; (penalty scored) Arteta; (penalty scored) Heitinga; (penalty scored) Neville

1 March Fifth round	Everton	0–1	Reading	Liverpool
19:30 GMT	Rodwell (yellow card) 35'; Neville (yellow card) 59'; Baines (yellow card) 64'	Report	Khizanishvili (yellow card) 22'; Mills 26'; Leigertwood (yellow card) 44'	Stadium: Goodison Park; Attendance: 29,976; Referee: Andre Marriner

== Players ==
=== First team squad ===
Note: Flags indicate national team as defined under FIFA eligibility rules; some limited exceptions apply. Players may hold more than one non-FIFA nationality.

No.	Pos.	Nation	Player
1	GK	SVK	Ján Mucha
2	DF	ENG	Tony Hibbert
3	DF	ENG	Leighton Baines
5	DF	NED	John Heitinga
6	DF	ENG	Phil Jagielka
7	MF	RUS	Diniyar Bilyaletdinov
8	FW	FRA	Louis Saha
10	MF	ESP	Mikel Arteta (vice-captain)
15	DF	FRA	Sylvain Distin
16	FW	ENG	Jermaine Beckford
17	MF	AUS	Tim Cahill
18	MF	ENG	Phil Neville (captain)

No.	Pos.	Nation	Player
19	FW	FRA	Magaye Gueye
21	MF	ENG	Leon Osman
23	DF	IRL	Séamus Coleman
24	GK	USA	Tim Howard
25	MF	BEL	Marouane Fellaini
26	MF	ENG	Jack Rodwell
27	FW	GRE	Apostolos Vellios
28	FW	NGR	Victor Anichebe
30	DF	GER	Shkodran Mustafi
33	MF	ENG	Adam Forshaw
34	DF	IRL	Shane Duffy
37	FW	ENG	Jose Baxter

=== Transfers in ===
Player	From	Date (Note: Players to sign transfers on or prior to 30 June do not officially move until 1 July.)	Fee
Ján Mucha	Legia Warszawa	22 January 2010	Free
Jermaine Beckford	Leeds United	31 May 2010	Free
João Silva	Aves	9 June 2010	Undisclosed
Magaye Gueye	Strasbourg	30 June 2010	£1,000,000
Araz Abdullayev	Neftchi Baku	7 January 2011	Undisclosed
Apostolos Vellios	Iraklis	31 January 2011	Undisclosed

=== Transfers out ===
Player	To	Date	Fee
John Ruddy	Norwich City	5 July 2010	Undisclosed
Dan Gosling	Newcastle United	7 July 2010	Free
Carlo Nash	Stoke City	13 July 2010	Free
Lukas Jutkiewicz	Coventry City	26 July 2010	Undisclosed
Steven Pienaar	Tottenham Hotspur	18 January 2011	Undisclosed

=== Loans in ===
Player	From	Date	Length of loan
Eric Dier	Sporting CP	20 January 2011	Season

=== Loans out ===
Player	To	Date	Length of loan
Iain Turner	Coventry City	13 August 2010	One month
Joseph Yobo	Fenerbahçe	31 August 2010	Season
James Vaughan	Crystal Palace	8 September 2010	Three months
Araz Abdullayev	Neftchi Baku	7 January 2011	Season
Yakubu	Leicester City	13 January 2011	Season
Kieran Agard	Kilmarnock	31 January 2011	Season
João Silva	União de Leiria	31 January 2011	Season
Iain Turner	Preston North End	9 February 2011	Two months
James Wallace	Stockport County	18 February 2011	Season
Shane Duffy	Burnley	24 March 2011	28 days

=== Player awards ===
- Player of the Season- Leighton Baines
- Players' Player of the Season - Leighton Baines
- Young Player of the Season - Séamus Coleman
- Reserve / U21 Player of the Season - Jose Baxter
- Academy Player of the Season - Jake Bidwell
- Goal of the Season - Leighton Baines vs. Chelsea

== Statistics ==
=== Appearances ===
No.	Pos	Nat	Player	Total		Premier League		FA Cup		League Cup	
No.	Pos	Nat	Player	Apps	Goals	Apps	Goals	Apps	Goals	Apps	Goals
1	GK	(Slovakia) SVK	Ján Mucha	2	0	0	0	0	0	2	0
2	DF	(England) ENG	Tony Hibbert	22	0	17+3	0	1	0	0+1	0
3	DF	(England) ENG	Leighton Baines	44	7	38	5	4	2	2	0
5	DF	(Netherlands) NED	John Heitinga	31	1	23+4	1	2+1	0	1	0
6	DF	(England) ENG	Phil Jagielka	36	1	31+2	1	2	0	1	0
7	MF	(Russia) RUS	Diniyar Bilyaletdinov	32	2	10+16	2	3+1	0	1+1	0
8	FW	(France) FRA	Louis Saha	26	10	14+8	7	3	2	0+1	1
10	MF	(Spain) ESP	Mikel Arteta	33	3	29	3	3	0	0+1	0
12	GK	(Scotland) SCO	Iain Turner	0	0	0	0	0	0	0	0
14	FW	(England) ENG	James Vaughan	1	0	0+1	0	0	0	0	0
15	DF	(France) FRA	Sylvain Distin	44	2	38	2	4	0	2	0
16	FW	(England) ENG	Jermaine Beckford	38	10	14+18	8	2+2	1	1+1	1
17	MF	(Australia) AUS	Tim Cahill	28	9	22+5	9	1	0	0	0
18	MF	(England) ENG	Phil Neville	35	1	31	1	3	0	1	0
19	FW	(France) FRA	Magaye Gueye	8	0	2+3	0	0+1	0	2	0
20	MF	(South Africa) RSA	Steven Pienaar	20	1	18	1	0	0	1+1	0
21	MF	(England) ENG	Leon Osman	31	5	20+6	4	3	0	2	1
22	FW	(Nigeria) NGR	Yakubu	15	1	7+7	1	0	0	1	0
23	DF	(Republic of Ireland) IRL	Séamus Coleman	40	6	25+9	4	4	1	2	1
24	GK	(United States) USA	Tim Howard	42	0	38	0	4	0	0	0
25	MF	(Belgium) BEL	Marouane Fellaini	25	3	19+1	1	3	1	2	1
26	MF	(England) ENG	Jack Rodwell	28	1	14+10	0	2+1	0	1	1
27	FW	(Greece) GRE	Apostolos Vellios	3	0	0+3	0	0	0	0	0
28	FW	(Nigeria) NGR	Victor Anichebe	19	0	8+8	0	0+3	0	0	0
29	MF	(Portugal) POR	João Silva	0	0	0	0	0	0	0	0
30	DF	(Germany) GER	Shkodran Mustafi	0	0	0	0	0	0	0	0
33	MF	(England) ENG	Adam Forshaw	1	0	0+1	0	0	0	0	0
34	DF	(Republic of Ireland) IRL	Shane Duffy	0	0	0	0	0	0	0	0
35	FW	(England) ENG	Kieran Agard	0	0	0	0	0	0	0	0
37	FW	(England) ENG	Jose Baxter	2	0	0+1	0	0+1	0	0	0
38	MF	(England) ENG	James Wallace	0	0	0	0	0	0	0	0

=== Goalscorers ===
Name	Premier League	League Cup	FA Cup	Total
Jermaine Beckford	8	1	1	10
Louis Saha	7	1	2	10
Tim Cahill	9	0	0	9
Leighton Baines	5	0	2	7
Séamus Coleman	4	1	1	6
Leon Osman	4	1	0	5
Mikel Arteta	3	0	0	3
Marouane Fellaini	1	1	1	3
Diniyar Bilyaletdinov	2	0	0	2
Sylvain Distin	2	0	0	2
Yakubu	1	0	0	1
John Heitinga	1	0	0	1
Phil Jagielka	1	0	0	1
Phil Neville	1	0	0	1
Steven Pienaar	1	0	0	1
Jack Rodwell	0	1	0	1
Total	50	6	7	63

=== Assists ===
Name	Premier League	League Cup	FA Cup	Total
Leighton Baines	11	0	1	12
Jermaine Beckford	3	1	2	6
Leon Osman	5	0	1	6
Mikel Arteta	4	0	0	4
Marouane Fellaini	3	0	1	4
Tim Cahill	3	0	0	3
Séamus Coleman	2	1	0	3
Diniyar Bilyaletdinov	2	1	0	3
Magaye Gueye	1	1	1	3
Yakubu	1	0	0	1
Phil Neville	1	0	0	1
Jack Rodwell	0	1	0	1
Total	36	5	6	47

=== Disciplinary record ===
Last updated on 25 May 2011.

Name	Number	Position	Premier League		League Cup		FA Cup		Total	
Name	Number	Position	Yellow card	Red card	Yellow card	Red card	Yellow card	Red card	Yellow card	Red card
Tony Hibbert	2	DF	3	0	0	0	0	0	3	0
Leighton Baines	3	DF	4	0	0	0	2	0	6	0
John Heitinga	5	DF	9	0	0	0	1	0	10	0
Phil Jagielka	6	DF	3	0	0	0	0	0	3	0
Diniyar Bilyaletdinov	7	MF	1	1	0	0	0	0	1	1
Mikel Arteta	10	MF	1	1	0	0	1	0	2	1
Sylvain Distin	15	DF	1	0	0	0	1	0	2	0
Jermaine Beckford	16	FW	3	0	0	0	0	0	3	0
Tim Cahill	17	MF	4	0	0	0	0	0	4	0
Phil Neville	18	DF	5	0	0	0	1	0	6	0
Steven Pienaar	20	MF	2	0	0	0	0	0	2	0
Leon Osman	21	MF	3	0	0	0	0	0	3	0
Séamus Coleman	23	DF	6	1	1	0	2	0	8	1
Tim Howard	24	GK	3	0	0	0	0	0	3	0
Marouane Fellaini	25	MF	3	1	1	0	0	0	4	1
Jack Rodwell	26	MF	5	0	0	0	1	0	6	0
Victor Anichebe	28	FW	2	1	0	0	0	0	2	1
Total			57	5	2	0	9	0	68	5

== Trophies ==
- Translink Cup vs Brisbane Roar – July
- Brotherhood Cup vs. CD Everton – August
