= Jose Baxter =

English footballer (born 1992)

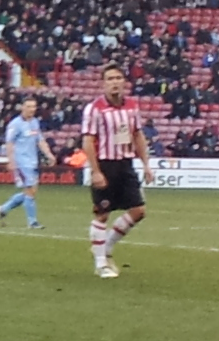
- Baxter playing for Sheffield United in 2014

Personal information
- Full name: Jose Baxter
- Date of birth: 7 February 1992 (age 34)
- Place of birth: Bootle, Merseyside, England
- Height: 5 ft 10 in (1.78 m)
- Position: Attacking midfielder

Youth career
- 1998–2008: Everton

Senior career*
Years	Team	Apps	(Gls)
2008–2012	Everton	7	(0)
2011–2012	→ Tranmere Rovers (loan)	14	(3)
2012–2013	Oldham Athletic	43	(15)
2013–2016	Sheffield United	93	(20)
2017–2018	Everton	0	(0)
2018–2019	Oldham Athletic	29	(4)
2019	Plymouth Argyle	9	(0)
2020	Memphis 901	8	(1)
Total		203	(43)

International career
2006–2008	England U16	8	(3)
2008–2009	England U17	9	(3)

Managerial career
- 2021–2025: Everton Academy (assistant)
- 2025–: Malaysia (assistant)
- * Club domestic league appearances and goals

Jose Baxter (born 7 February 1992) is an English former professional footballer who played as an attacking midfielder.

Born in Bootle, Baxter began his career with his hometown club Everton, where he became the Premier League's youngest-ever starter in 2008 at the age of 16 years and 191 days, a record that stood until 2026 when it was surpassed by Max Dowman.

After having been on the fringes of the first team and spending time on loan at Tranmere Rovers, he rejected a new contract in 2012 in order to find regular football elsewhere. He joined Oldham Athletic shortly afterwards, where he spent a successful season before being bought by Sheffield United just under 12 months later.

After a three-year period in Yorkshire interrupted by suspensions, he was released and had a spell without a club before Everton signed him again in 2017 to rebuild his career in their reserve squad. He returned to Oldham in the summer of 2018. In July 2019, he signed for Plymouth Argyle, and left them in November 2019.

Baxter represented England at both under-16 and under-17 level.

== Club career ==
=== Everton ===
Baxter joined Everton as a six-year-old. He remained as a youth player until 2008 when he trained with the first-team squad on tours to Switzerland and the United States two months after leaving school.

Baxter made his professional début for the club on the opening day of the 2008–09 season coming on as a 78th-minute substitute for Nuno Valente in a home game against Blackburn Rovers, becoming Everton's youngest ever senior player in the process, aged 16 years and 191 days, beating the record previously held by teammate James Vaughan.

Baxter was named in the starting line up to play West Bromwich Albion at The Hawthorns, becoming the youngest Everton player ever to start a game, and March 2009 he signed a new two-and-a-half-year contract with Everton. Baxter remained in the squad, making a number of substitute appearances in 2009–10 season. He also played in the UEFA Europa League against BATE Borisov at Goodison Park.

Baxter joined Tranmere Rovers on loan in September 2011 and went on to score on his debut against Preston North End. The loan was extended several times until January 2012, when he was recalled by Everton. Still on the fringes of the first team, Baxter rejected a new contract from Everton and was released at the end of the 2011–12 season.

=== Oldham Athletic ===
Following his release from Everton, Baxter had a trial at Crystal Palace but did not earn a contract. He subsequently signed for League One side Oldham Athletic in September 2012, agreeing a four-month contract. He made his debut for the club the following day, scoring in a 2–2 draw versus Notts County.

Playing and scoring regularly, Baxter's form drew interest from other league clubs but in January 2013 he signed a new 2 1/2-year deal with Oldham. Baxter started the 2013–14 season as a first team regular, but a brace against Stevenage in a 4–3 opening day victory prompted renewed interest from other clubs in acquiring his services.

=== Sheffield United ===
Baxter reunited with his former Everton youth manager David Weir when he signed for Sheffield United for £500,000, agreeing a three-year deal. On 7 September 2013, Baxter scored his first Sheffield United goal against South Yorkshire rivals Rotherham United in a 3–1 defeat. With the arrival of Nigel Clough as United's manager, Baxter eventually began to cement his place in the first team, scoring six goals in the process, and was nominated for the League One 'Player of the Month' award for December 2013. He played in the semi-final of the 2013–14 FA Cup at Wembley Stadium and scored the opening goal, but opponents Hull City won the tie 5–3.

On 7 December 2014, he converted two penalties in a 3–0 home victory against Plymouth Argyle to send the Blades to the Third Round of the FA Cup. On 10 February 2015, Baxter scored a brace in a 4–1 home victory over Colchester United.

On 16 May 2015, Baxter was suspended by Sheffield United after failing a drugs test. In July, the FA handed him a five-month suspension (three of which suspended) for testing positive for ecstasy, which he claimed was ingested in a spiked drink. He was suspended by his club again in February 2016. He was subsequently released in May 2016.

=== Return to Everton ===
On 27 January 2017, Baxter was handed a lifeline by former club Everton who offered him a 12-month contract which would begin when his year-long suspension from football ended on 1 July 2017. Despite not making an appearance for the first team, he played ten games for the club's Under-23s over the course of the season, assisting two goals. He was released by Everton at the end of the 2017–18 season.

=== Return to Oldham Athletic ===
On 30 May 2018, Baxter returned to Oldham Athletic five years after leaving the club; he signed a one-year contract with an option of a further year and was given the squad number eight, previously worn by Ollie Banks. Baxter made his second debut for Latics in a pre-season game versus Ashton United where he scored the second goal in a 3–1 victory.

=== Plymouth Argyle ===
On 25 July 2019, Baxter joined Plymouth Argyle on a short-term deal following his release from Oldham. Baxter made his debut as a substitute in Argyle's 3–0 victory over Crewe Alexandra on the first day of the 2019–20 season. A calf injury sustained hindered Baxter's stint with the Pilgrims, with his contract terminated in November 2019 During his time with Plymouth Argyle Baxter was favourably received, with a notable performance against Swindon Town.

=== Memphis 901 ===
On 19 February 2020, Baxter joined American side Memphis 901 FC, a member of the second-tier USL Championship.

He retired on 8 August 2021 at the age of 29.

== International career ==
Baxter has represented England at both U16 and U17 levels. He played in the first two games of the 2009 Under 17 European Championships but missed the third after picking up two yellow cards.

== Coaching career ==
After retiring as a player, Baxter returned to his former club to work as a coach as part of the Everton academy. In May 2025, he joined the Malaysia national team as assistant coach.

== Personal life ==
Having grown up on Merseyside, Baxter is a fan of local team Liverpool. In October 2009, Baxter was one of three men arrested in Kirkby on suspicion of possession of cannabis with intent to supply, and on suspicion of possessing counterfeit money. He was subsequently released without charge.

== Career statistics ==
Appearances and goals by club, season and competition
Club	Season	Division	League		FA Cup		League Cup		Other		Total	
Club	Season	Division	Apps	Goals	Apps	Goals	Apps	Goals	Apps	Goals	Apps	Goals
Everton	2008–09	Premier League	3	0	0	0	1	0	0	0	4	0
Everton	2009–10	Premier League	2	0	0	0	0	0	5 (Note: Appearance(s) in UEFA Europa League)	0	7	0
Everton	2010–11	Premier League	1	0	1	0	0	0	—		2	0
Everton	2011–12	Premier League	1	0	0	0	1	0	—		2	0
Everton	Total		7	0	1	0	2	0	5	0	15	0
Tranmere Rovers (loan)	2011–12	League One	14	3	0	0	0	0	1 (Note: Appearance(s) in Football League Trophy)	0	15	3
Oldham Athletic	2012–13	League One	39	13	6	2	0	0	0	0	45	15
Oldham Athletic	2013–14	League One	4	2	0	0	1	0	0	0	5	2
Oldham Athletic	Total		43	15	6	2	1	0	0	0	50	17
Sheffield United	2013–14	League One	35	6	8	2	0	0	2	0	45	8
Sheffield United	2014–15	League One	34	10	6	2	6	0	2	1	48	13
Sheffield United	2015–16	League One	24	4	1	1	1	0	2	2	28	7
Sheffield United	Total		93	20	15	5	7	0	6	3	121	28
Everton	2017–18	Premier League	0	0	0	0	0	0	0	0	0	0
Everton U21s	2017–18	—			—		—		1	0	1	0
Oldham Athletic	2018–19	League Two	29	4	2	0	1	0	2	0	34	4
Plymouth Argyle	2019–20	League Two	9	0	0	0	2	1	1	0	12	1
Memphis 901	2020	USL Championship	8	1	—		—		—		8	1
Career total			203	43	24	7	13	1	16	3	256	54

== Honours ==
Everton

- FA Cup runner-up: 2008–09

England U16

- Victory Shield: 2006, 2007
- Tournoi de Montaigu: 2008
