= John Heitinga =

Dutch football player and coach (born 1983)

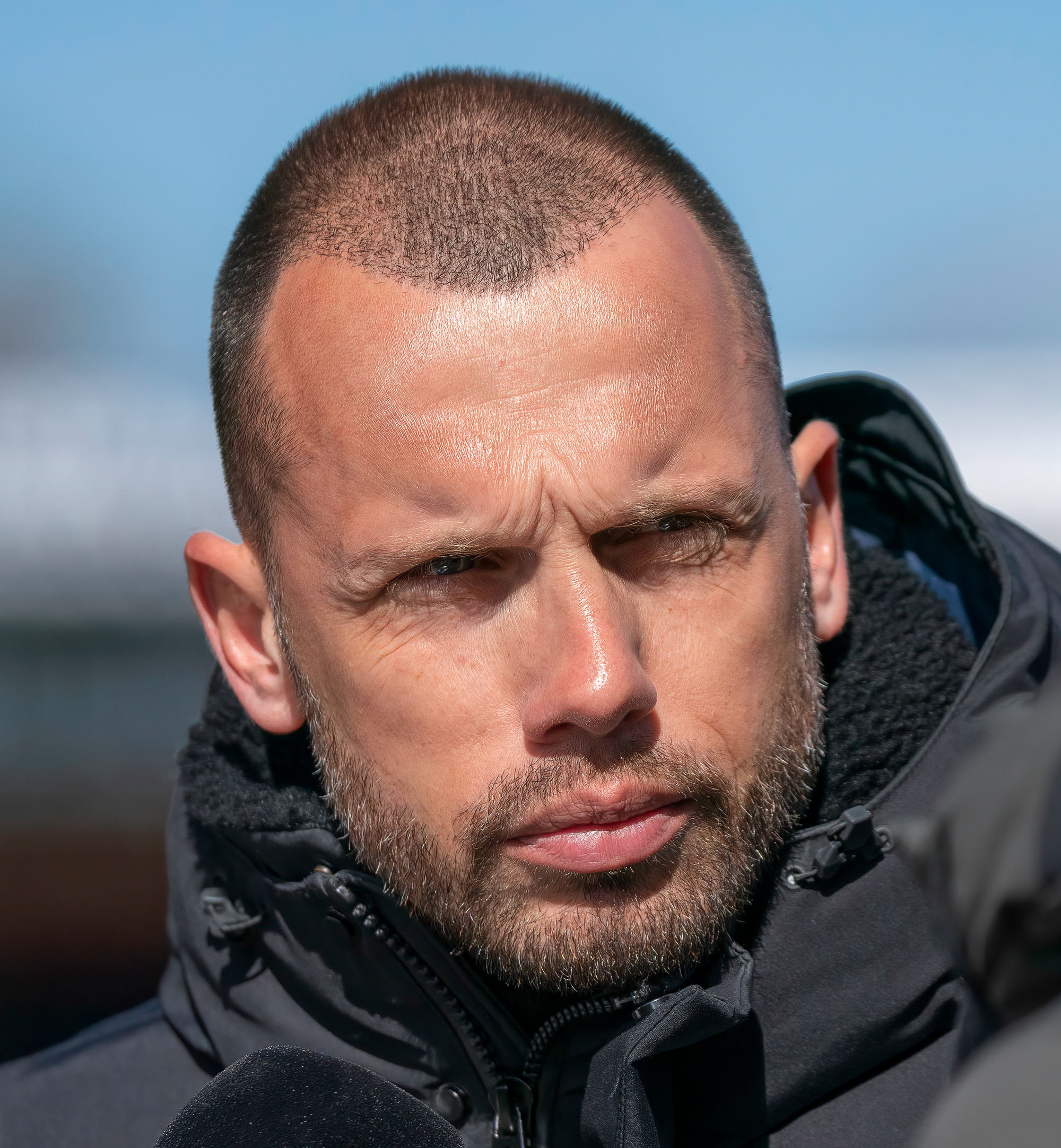
- Heitinga as manager of Ajax in 2023

Personal information
- Full name: John Gijsbert Alan Heitinga
- Date of birth: 15 November 1983 (age 43)
- Place of birth: Alphen aan den Rijn, Netherlands
- Height: 1.80 m (5 ft 11 in)
- Position: Centre-back

Youth career
- 1987–1990: ARC
- 1990–2001: Ajax

Senior career*
Years	Team	Apps	(Gls)
2001–2008	Ajax	152	(17)
2008–2009	Atlético Madrid	28	(3)
2009–2014	Everton	115	(2)
2014	Fulham	14	(1)
2014–2015	Hertha BSC	13	(1)
2015–2016	Ajax	2	(0)
Total		324	(24)

International career
2004–2013	Netherlands	87	(7)

Managerial career
- 2021–2023: Jong Ajax
- 2023: Ajax
- 2025: Ajax
Medal record
Men's football
Representing Netherlands
FIFA World Cup
Runner-up	2010 South Africa
UEFA European Championship
Bronze medal – third place	2004 Portugal
UEFA European Under-16 Championship
Bronze medal – third place	2000 Israel	U-16 Team
- * Club domestic league appearances and goals

Johnny Gijsbert Alan Heitinga (born 15 November 1983) is a Dutch football coach and former player, most recently an assistant coach at Premier League side Tottenham Hotspur.

A centre-back and product of the Ajax Academy, he played for their first squad from 2001 to 2008, winning two Eredivisie and three KNVB Cup titles. After a one-year spell at Atlético Madrid in Spain, he signed for Everton in 2009. He joined Fulham at the start of 2014 then signed with German side Hertha BSC later that year. In June 2015, he returned to his Ajax for a single season before retiring in 2016.

After making his debut for the Netherlands national team in February 2004, Heitinga earned 87 caps and represented his country at two World Cups (2006 and 2010) and three European Championships (2004, 2008, and 2012). He helped the Dutch to the World Cup final in 2010, in which he was sent off in a loss to Spain. In 2008, he was named Dutch Footballer of the Year.

== Early life ==
Heitinga was born in Alphen aan den Rijn, South Holland, and raised in Amsterdam. He is of Indonesian descent through his paternal grandfather.

== Club career ==
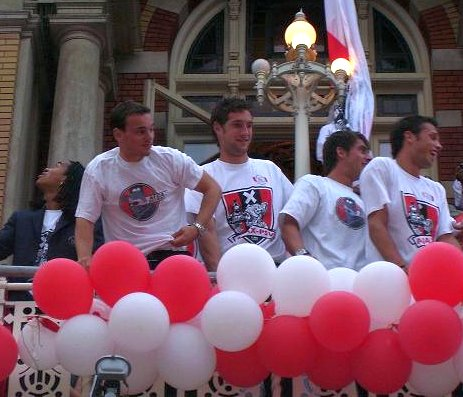
Heitinga (right, with Urby Emanuelson, Wesley Sneijder, Maarten Stekelenburg, and Zdeněk Grygera) played for Ajax from 2001 to 2008.

=== Ajax ===
Heitinga was part of the Ajax youth team, before making his debut for the first team on 26 August 2001 against Feyenoord. He was part a new wave of talent that fielded the likes of homegrown stars Rafael van der Vaart and Wesley Sneijder, as well as Zlatan Ibrahimović and Cristian Chivu. He was featured in a documentary entitled Ajax: Hark the Herald Angel Sings alongside Ajax academy pupils Gregory van der Wiel, Mitchell Donald, Jeffrey Sarpong, Donovan Slijngard, Nordin Amrabat, Evander Sno and Jeremain Lens.

Heitinga quickly established himself as a strong addition to the team and became first-choice player under coach Co Adriaanse and later Ronald Koeman until he suffered a serious knee injury which kept him on the sidelines for over six months. His comeback was short-lived, as he played only one game before suffering yet another injury which again sentenced him to a long period of recovery.

He made his second comeback at the start of the 2003–04 season and impressed in his first game since injury against Volendam, from where he went on to become a first choice central defender for the remainder of the season as well as a popular figure amongst the fans. When it was announced that he would be leaving Ajax at the end of the 2007–08 season, the fans gave him a fitting send-off by displaying a mosaic of him on the stands.

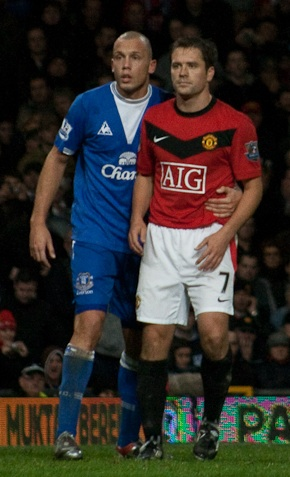
Heitinga (left) with Michael Owen.

=== Atlético Madrid ===
Heitinga moved to Atlético Madrid at the end of the 2007–08 season for a fee of £8.8 million. His first season in Spain ended with Heitinga making 32 appearances – 27 in La Liga – and scoring three goals for Atlético.

=== Everton ===
In September 2009, aged 25, Heitinga joined English Premier League club Everton on a five-year contract for a fee of around €7.04 million (£6.2 million). He was given squad number 5, though he was not eligible to represent Everton in the UEFA Europa League, having already played for Atlético Madrid in the qualifying stage of the Champions League. Heitinga made his debut for Everton on 13 September against Fulham after coming on for the injured Phil Neville. In his first season for the club, Heitinga made 35 appearances in all competitions.

In the 2010–11 FA Cup, Everton held holders Chelsea 1–1 in a replay at Stamford Bridge, sending the tie to penalties. Heitinga took Everton's fourth and scored. Phil Neville went on to score the winning penalty for Everton. Later that season, Heitinga scored his first goal for the club in a 1–1 draw at home to Birmingham City. Heitinga was voted Everton's Player of the Season for 2011–12 by the club's supporters. He then scored against Newcastle on the final day of the season with an unmarked header which put Everton 3–0, his second Premier League goal and his first in over 14 months.

In 2012–13 season, manager David Moyes opted to play Phil Jagielka and Sylvain Distin in central defence for much of Everton's season. Heitinga had to wait until an injury to Jagielka gave him a sustained run in the team but poor performances which included him being culpable for all three goals in a 3–3 draw with Aston Villa led to him being criticised by fans. However, in April Moyes praised Heitinga's mental strength for battling back after his earlier form in the season would have "broken" most players. Despite this, Heitinga revealed that he had rejected Everton's offer of a new contract at the end of the year. In January 2014, Everton and West Ham United agreed terms for the transfer of Heitinga. He turned down the move however saying: "You have to be convinced that you are taking the right step and I was not". He scored his last goal for the team in his last outing, Everton's 4–0 FA Cup win against Stevenage.

=== Later career ===
On 31 January 2014, Heitinga signed for Fulham for a six-month deal on a free transfer. In a 3–1 loss against Chelsea on 1 March, Heitinga scored the only goal for Fulham. On 23 May 2014, he was released from the club at the end of his contract.

Heitinga signed a two-year contract with German club Hertha BSC in June 2014.

On 25 June 2015, Ajax announced that Heitinga would return to the club on a free transfer. He signed a one-year contract with the option of a second year. However, after playing only two Eredivisie matches in the first half of the season, Heitinga decided to retire from professional football on 1 February 2016.

== International career ==
=== Euro 2004 ===
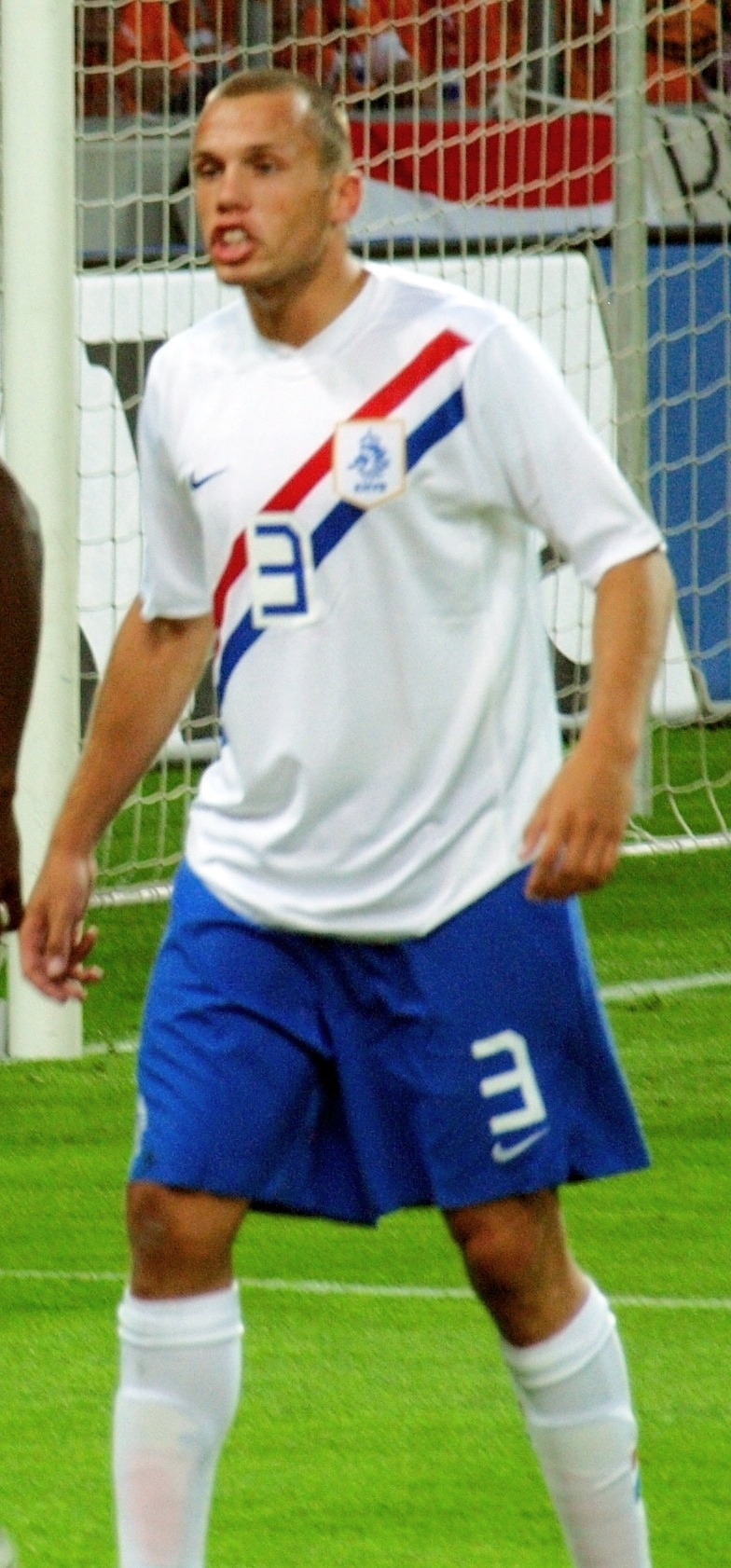
Heitinga playing for the Netherlands.

Having been part of Dutch international youth teams, Heitinga made his senior debut for the Netherlands on 18 February 2004 in a friendly game against the United States. Several months later, he scored his first goal from a Rafael van der Vaart free kick in a friendly against Greece.

Although he did not take part in qualifying, Heitinga was later included in the squad for the Euro 2004 in Portugal since the Dutch under-21 team had failed to qualify for the European Championships. He started as first choice right back in the first two group stage matches but was suspended for the last match when he was sent-off for two bookable offences. After serving his suspension, he returned in the quarter-final against Sweden as a second-half substitute for Edgar Davids and converted his penalty as the Dutch won 5–4 on penalties. The Dutch, however, were eliminated by the hosts Portugal in the semi-finals.

=== 2006 World Cup and Euro 2008 ===
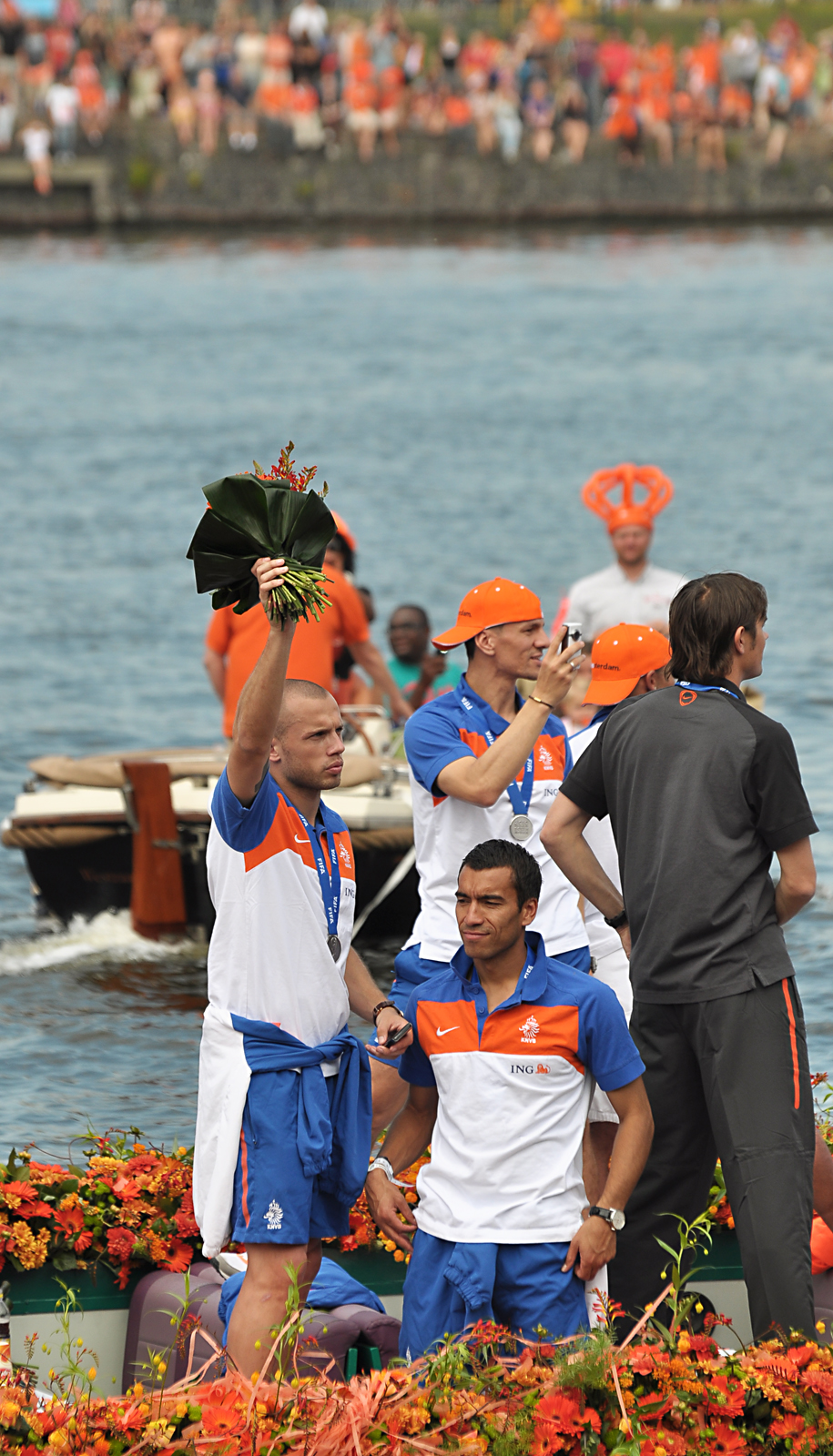
John Heitinga (left) with Giovanni van Bronckhorst, Khalid Boulahrouz and Phillip Cocu in 2010.

Heitinga was selected by Marco van Basten for the Dutch national team of 23 players to compete in the 2006 FIFA World Cup, hosted by Germany. The Dutch reached the second round before again being knocked out by Portugal.

Heitinga was also called up to the Dutch squad for Euro 2008 in Austria and Switzerland. Since Euro 2008, he has been a regular in the right back position and has occasionally deputised in other defensive positions during an injury crisis. He made his 50th appearance for the Netherlands in a friendly against Paraguay on 18 November 2009.

=== 2010 World Cup ===
Heitinga was included in the squad for the 2010 FIFA World Cup in South Africa, and was in the starting line-up for the Netherlands' first match in the competition, a 2–0 victory over Denmark. Heitinga played in every game as the Netherlands reached the final for the third time, where they faced Spain. He started the match but was sent off in the 109th minute after being given his second yellow card for a foul on Andrés Iniesta. He became the fifth player to be sent off in a World Cup final. (Note: The previous players to be sent off in a World Cup Final are Pedro Monzón, Gustavo Dezotti, Marcel Desailly, and Zinedine Zidane.) The Netherlands went on to lose the final 1–0 after Iniesta scored the winning goal for Spain in the 116th minute.

== Coaching career ==
In June 2021, Heitinga was appointed manager of Jong Ajax, the reserve team of Ajax competing in the Eerste Divisie. He signed a contract for two seasons running until June 2023. In 2022, he extended his contract until 2025. On 27 January 2023, Heitinga was appointed interim manager of Ajax's first team for the remainder of the season, following the dismissal of Alfred Schreuder. His first match in charge was a 4–1 away win against Excelsior on 29 January. Under Heitinga's guidance, Ajax finished in third place in the Eredivisie, securing a place in the UEFA Europa League play-off round. They also reached the final of the KNVB Cup, losing to PSV on penalties after a 1–1 draw. On 1 June 2023, it was announced that Heitinga would not continue as manager of Ajax beyond his interim spell, with the club deciding to appoint Maurice Steijn instead.

In September 2023, Heitinga was appointed first-team coach at West Ham United as assistant to David Moyes, his former manager at Everton. Upon the departure of Moyes in May 2024, Heitinga left the club, along with other coaches and back-room staff. On 17 July 2024, Heitinga was appointed as the new assistant coach at Liverpool. He took charge of Liverpool for the first time in a 2–0 win over Newcastle United on 26 February 2025, whilst manager Arne Slot and assistant manager Sipke Hulshoff were suspended. That season, Liverpool, under Slot's leadership, won the Premier League title.

On 31 May 2025, Heitinga agreed to return to his former club Ajax as head coach, signing a two-year contract set to begin with the 2025–26 season.

On 6 November 2025, just five months after being announced as head coach of Ajax, Heitinga was dismissed following the club's 3–0 home defeat to Turkish side Galatasaray in the Champions League, which saw them sit bottom of the league phase table, failing to secure a point in their four matches.

On 15 January 2026, Heitinga was appointed as first team assistant coach at Tottenham Hotspur as part of Thomas Frank’s coaching staff. He was relieved of his duties on the 16th of February 2026.

== Career statistics ==
=== Club ===
Appearances and goals by club, season and competition
Club	Season	League			National cup (Note: Includes KNVB Cup, Copa del Rey, FA Cup, DFB-Pokal)		League cup (Note: Includes Football League Cup)		Continental		Other		Total	
Club	Season	Division	Apps	Goals	Apps	Goals	Apps	Goals	Apps	Goals	Apps	Goals	Apps	Goals
Ajax	2001–02	Eredivisie	15	0	1	0	—		3	0	—		19	0
Ajax	2002–03	Eredivisie	1	0	0	0	—		0	0	0	0	1	0
Ajax	2003–04	Eredivisie	26	3	1	0	—		3 (Note: Appearances in UEFA Champions League)	0	—		30	3
Ajax	2004–05	Eredivisie	26	1	3	0	—		6	0	1 (Note: Appearance in Johan Cruyff Shield)	0	36	1
Ajax	2005–06	Eredivisie	19	1	3	0	—		6	0	5 (Note: One appearance in Johan Cruyff Shield, four appearances and one goal in Eredivisie play-offs)	1	33	2
Ajax	2006–07	Eredivisie	32	6	5	1	—		9 (Note: Two appearances in UEFA Champions League, seven appearances and one goal in UEFA Cup)	1	5 (Note: One appearance in Johan Cruyff Shield, four appearances and one goal in Eredivisie play-offs)	1	51	9
Ajax	2007–08	Eredivisie	33	6	3	2	—		4 (Note: Appearances in UEFA Cup)	0	5 (Note: One appearance in Johan Cruyff Shield, four appearances and one goal in Eredivisie play-offs)	1	45	9
Ajax	Total		152	17	16	3	—		31	1	16	3	215	24
Atlético Madrid	2008–09	La Liga	27	3	1	0	—		6	0	—		34	3
Atlético Madrid	2009–10	La Liga	1	0	0	0	—		2	0	—		3	0
Atlético Madrid	Total		28	3	1	0	—		8	0	—		37	3
Everton	2009–10	Premier League	31	0	2	0	2	0	—		—		35	0
Everton	2010–11	Premier League	27	1	3	0	1	0	—		—		31	1
Everton	2011–12	Premier League	30	1	6	1	3	0	—		—		39	2
Everton	2012–13	Premier League	26	0	2	1	2	0	—		—		30	1
Everton	2013–14	Premier League	1	0	2	1	2	0	—		—		5	1
Everton	Total		115	2	15	3	10	0	—		—		140	5
Fulham	2013–14	Premier League	14	1	0	0	0	0	—		—		14	1
Hertha BSC	2014–15	Bundesliga	13	1	1	0	—		—		—		14	1
Ajax	2015–16	Eredivisie	2	0	1	1	0	0	—		—		3	1
Career total			324	24	34	7	10	0	39	1	16	3	423	35

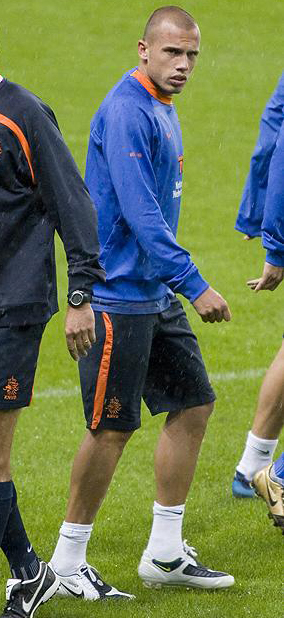
Heitinga in 2008 during training.

=== International ===
Appearances and goals by national team and year
National team	Year	Apps	Goals
Netherlands	2004	12	1
Netherlands	2005	4	0
Netherlands	2006	8	1
Netherlands	2007	7	1
Netherlands	2008	12	3
Netherlands	2009	7	0
Netherlands	2010	15	0
Netherlands	2011	9	1
Netherlands	2012	11	0
Netherlands	2013	2	0
Total		87	7

Scores and results list the Netherlands' goal tally first, score column indicates score after each Heitinga goal.

List of international goals scored by John Heitinga
Goal	Date	Venue	Opponent	Score	Result	Competition
1.	28 April 2004	Philips Stadion, Eindhoven, Netherlands	Greece	3–0	4–0	Friendly
2.	1 June 2006	Philips Stadion, Eindhoven, Netherlands	Mexico	1–1	2–1	Friendly
3.	6 June 2007	Rajamangala Stadium, Bangkok, Thailand	Thailand	2–0	3–1	Friendly
4.	6 February 2008	Poljud Stadium, Split, Croatia	Croatia	1–0	3–0	Friendly
5.	26 March 2008	Ernst-Happel-Stadion, Vienna, Austria	Austria	2–3	4–3	Friendly
6.	10 September 2008	Skopje City Stadium, Skopje, Macedonia	Macedonia	1–0	2–1	2010 FIFA World Cup qualification
7.	2 September 2011	Philips Stadion, Eindhoven, Netherlands	San Marino	3–0	11–0	UEFA Euro 2012 qualifying

== Managerial statistics ==
As of 5 November 2025

Managerial record by team and tenure
Team	Nat	From	To	Record					Ref
Team	Nat	From	To	G	W	D	L	Win %	Ref
Jong Ajax	(Netherlands)	1 July 2021	27 January 2023	59	23	17	19	38.98	
Ajax	(Netherlands)	27 January 2023	14 June 2023	22	14	4	4	63.64	
Ajax	(Netherlands)	31 May 2025	6 November 2025	15	5	5	5	33.33	
Total				96	42	26	28	43.75	—

== Honours ==
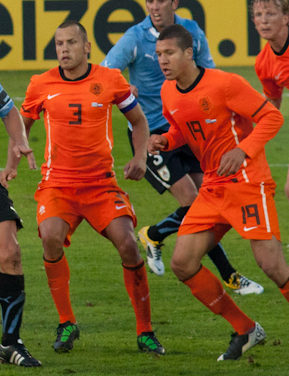
Heitinga (left) with Jeffrey Bruma

Ajax

- Eredivisie: 2001–02, 2003–04
- KNVB Cup: 2001–02, 2005–06, 2006–07
- Johan Cruyff Shield: 2002, 2005, 2006, 2007

Netherlands

- FIFA World Cup runner-up: 2010

Individual

- Amsterdam Sportsman of the Year: 2001
- Ajax Talent of the Future (Sjaak Swart Award): 2000–01
- Dutch Football Talent of the Year: 2003–04
- Dutch Footballer of the Year: 2007–08
- Everton Player of the Season: 2011–12

== Notes ==
Awards
Preceded by Marten Eikelboom	Amsterdam Sportsman of the Year; 2001	Succeeded by Edwin de Nijs
