= Diniyar Bilyaletdinov =

Russian footballer (born 1985)

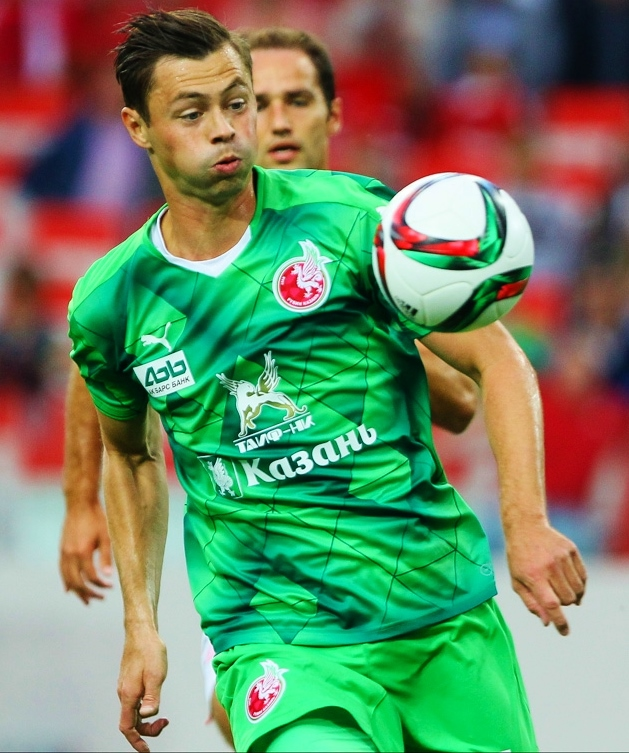
- Bilyaletdinov with Rubin in 2015

Personal information
- Full name: Diniyar Rinatovich Bilyaletdinov
- Date of birth: 27 February 1985 (age 41)
- Place of birth: Moscow, Soviet Union
- Height: 1.86 m (6 ft 1 in)
- Position: Midfielder

Youth career
- 2000–2004: Lokomotiv Moscow

Senior career*
Years	Team	Apps	(Gls)
2004–2009	Lokomotiv Moscow	150	(31)
2009–2012	Everton	59	(8)
2012–2015	Spartak Moscow	24	(4)
2014	→ Anzhi Makhachkala (loan)	11	(2)
2014–2015	→ Torpedo Moscow (loan)	17	(2)
2015–2017	Rubin Kazan	14	(2)
2017–2018	Trakai	34	(12)
Total		309	(61)

International career
2004–2005	Russia U-21	13	(3)
2005–2012	Russia	46	(6)
- * Club domestic league appearances and goals

Diniyar Rinatovich Bilyaletdinov (Russian: Динияр Ринатович Билялетдинов, Tatar: Динияр Ринат улы Билалетдинев; born 27 February 1985) is a Russian former professional footballer who played as a midfielder.

He began his career at Lokomotiv Moscow, where he made 185 appearances and scored 38 goals across six seasons, winning four major honours. In August 2009 he was signed by Everton of the Premier League for a reported £9 million fee. He returned to Russia in January 2012 when he signed for Spartak Moscow, who loaned him out several times.

Bilyaletdinov played for Russia from 2005 to 2012, earning 46 caps and scoring 6 goals. He was part of their team which reached the semi-finals at Euro 2008.

== Club career ==
=== Lokomotiv Moscow ===
A native of Moscow, Bilyaletdinov began his career in the Lokomotiv Moscow youth teams. After making his debut in 2004 aged 19, he became a first team regular. In his first season the club won the Russian Premier League and was named the league's Young Player of the Year. He was the Lokomotiv captain for the 2007 season.

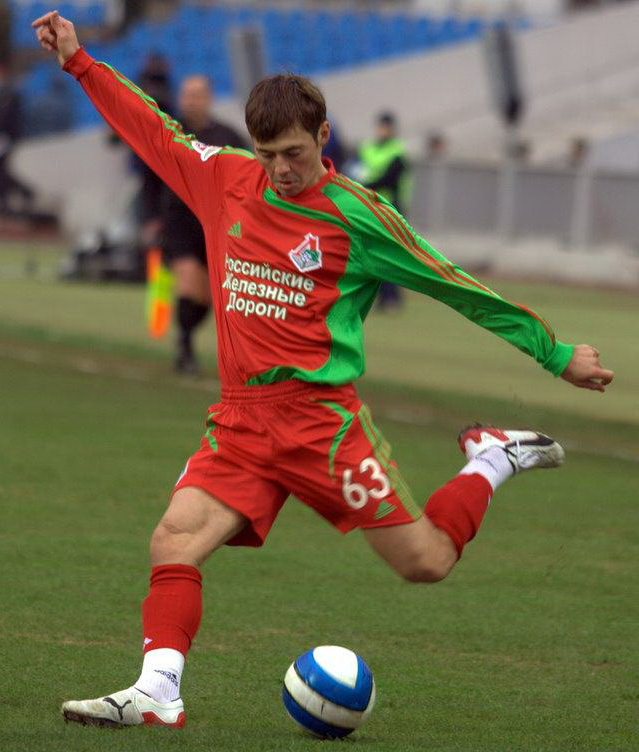
Bilyaletdinov playing for Lokomotiv Moscow in 2007.

=== Everton ===
Bilyaletdinov signed a four-year contract with English club Everton in August 2009 for an undisclosed fee – believed to be £9 million – upon recommendation from national team manager Guus Hiddink, who was at Chelsea at that time. The move made him Everton's third most expensive signing in their history.

He made his debut for Everton coming on as an 89th-minute substitute in a 2–1 win over Wigan Athletic later in the month. On 17 October 2009, Bilyaletdinov scored his first goal for the club in a 1–1 draw against Wolverhampton Wanderers and scored again on the following week in a 1–1 draw against Aston Villa, but received his first red card in the Premier League later on in the match.

He contributed two assists in his first-ever start for Everton in the inaugural UEFA Europa League in a 4–0 win over AEK Athens, and scored against them again in the last group stage game. Bilyaletdinov scored seven goals in his first season in England, including one against Manchester United that was voted the club's goal of the season. On the final day of the 2009–10 which is 9 May 2010, he scored another brilliant goal in Everton's 1–0 win over Portsmouth which was arguably better than the goal of the season he scored.

The following season, Bilyaletdinov began to find himself on the bench, but in the second half of the season, he made more appearances following the departure of Steven Pienaar to Tottenham Hotspur. Bilyaletdinov scored his first goal of the 2010-11 Premier League season coming on as a substitute against West Ham United which was arguably even better than the other two we were on about. He scored his second against Wolverhampton Wanderers. In the final game of the 2010–11 season, on 14 May, Bilyaletdinov received another red card in a 1–0 loss against West Brom. After the game, the club decided not to appeal his sending off, so he served a three-match ban ahead of the new season.

However, despite scoring 9 goals in 77 appearances, he failed to make a major impact during his time at Everton and had been on the fringes of the first team squad during the 2011–12 season after finding himself playing in the reserves. In November 2011, Bilyaletdinov said that he sought to leave the club if he did not get a first team place, as he feared losing his place in the national team. Bilyaletdinov made his last appearance for Everton in a 1–1 draw against Aston Villa on 14 January 2012. After leaving Everton, Bilyaletdinov spoke out by criticising their tactics and lack of creativity with a problem of scoring.

=== Spartak Moscow ===
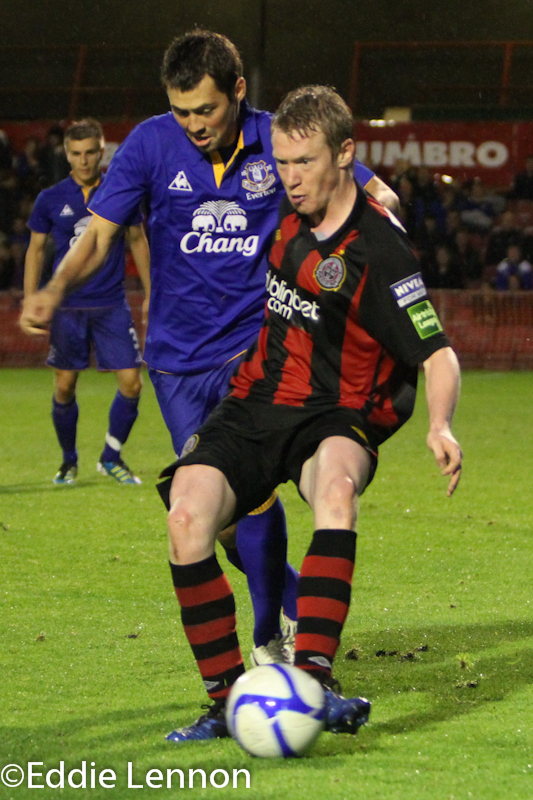
Bilyaletdinov in a match against Bohemian.

In January 2012, Bilyaletdinov was sold to Spartak Moscow for an undisclosed fee, as Everton wished to raise funds to buy other players. After his move to Spartak Moscow, Bilyaletdinov was given the number 25 shirt. Bilyaletdinov made his debut for Spartak Moscow in a 1–1 draw against Rubin Kazan on 5 March 2012. On 6 May 2012, Bilyaletdinov scored his first goal in over three years since leaving the country and first for the club in a 3–2 win over Zenit Saint Petersburg. In January 2014, Bilyaletdinov was loaned to fellow league team Anzhi Makhachkala. On 23 July 2015, Bilyaletdinov's contract with Spartak was terminated by mutual consent.

=== Trakai ===
On 19 September 2017, he signed with the Lithuanian club FK Trakai. After the 2018 season he left the club.

== International career ==
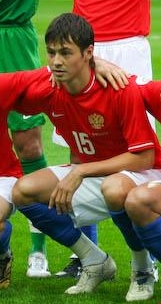
Diniyar Bilyaletdinov before home match against FYR Macedonia

After Russia failed to qualify for the 2006 FIFA World Cup, he and several younger players were recalled to the U-21 squad for the 2006 UEFA U21 championship playoffs against Denmark but lost out to the Danes.

Bilyaletdinov played in ten out of twelve UEFA Euro 2008 qualifiers. He scored the equalising goal against Israel, but the team lost in final minutes, 1–2. In the following match against Andorra, he assisted Dmitri Sychev in scoring the winning goal, resulting in the team qualifying for the tournament proper. He was called up to Russia's squad for Euro 2008 and played in all of Russia's run to the tournament's semi-final. For the FIFA 2010 World Cup qualification he was called up for six of the ten matches and scored twice in the play-off first leg against Slovenia, which Russia won 2–1. His two goals were not enough as Russia lost the second leg 1–0 and Slovenia progressed to the World Cup on the away goals rule.

== Personal life ==
Bilyaletdinov is an ethnic Tatar. His father Rinat Bilyaletdinov was also a professional footballer and is now a coach. The Bilyaletdinov family roots are in Nizhny Novgorod Oblast Mishar Tatar villages.

On 11 June 2011, Bilyaletdinov married Maria, a former cheerleader for the basketball club CSKA Moscow. Their first son, Timur, was born on 21 March 2012.

It was reported on 28 September 2022, that Diniyar Bilyaletdinov has been drafted into the Russian army following the partial mobilization announcement made by President Vladimir Putin. Diniyar clarified on the next day that he won't be called up at this time, after his military registration data was brought up-to-date during a visit to the military commissariat.

== Career statistics ==
=== Club ===
As of 16 June 2016

Appearances and goals by club, season and competition
Club	Season	League			National cup (Note: Includes CIS Cup, Russian Cup, FA Cup)		Europe		Other		Total	
Club	Season	Division	Apps	Goals	Apps	Goals	Apps	Goals	Apps	Goals	Apps	Goals
Lokomotiv Moscow	2004	Russian Premier League	25	5	2	0	–		–		27	5
Lokomotiv Moscow	2005	Russian Premier League	29	8	1	0	12	1	1 (Note: Appearance in Russian Super Cup)	0	43	9
Lokomotiv Moscow	2006	Russian Premier League	29	3	3	1	2	0	–		34	4
Lokomotiv Moscow	2007	Russian Premier League	28	3	5	2	6	3	–		39	8
Lokomotiv Moscow	2008	Russian Premier League	26	9	1	0	0	0	1	0	28	9
Lokomotiv Moscow	2009	Russian Premier League	13	3	1	0	–		–		14	3
Lokomotiv Moscow	Total		150	31	13	3	20	4	2	0	185	38
Everton	2009–10	Premier League	23	6	2	0	7 (Note: Appearance(s) in UEFA Europa League)	1	1 (Note: Appearance(s) in Football League Cup)	0	33	7
Everton	2010–11	Premier League	26	2	4	0	–		2	0	32	2
Everton	2011–12	Premier League	10	0	1	0	–		1	0	12	0
Everton	Total		59	8	7	0	7	1	4	0	77	9
Spartak Moscow	2011–12	Russian Premier League	8	1	0	0	–		–		8	1
Spartak Moscow	2012–13	Russian Premier League	14	3	1	0	4 (Note: Appearances in UEFA Champions League)	0	–		19	3
Spartak Moscow	2013–14	Russian Premier League	2	0	0	0	1	0	–		3	0
Spartak Moscow	Total		24	4	1	0	5	0	–		30	4
Anzhi Makhachkala (loan)	2013–14	Russian Premier League	11	2	0	0	–		–		11	2
Torpedo Moscow (loan)	2014–15	Russian Premier League	17	2	2	0	–		–		19	2
Rubin Kazan	2015–16	Russian Premier League	14	2	0	0	7	0	–		21	2
Rubin Kazan	2016–17	Russian Premier League	0	0	0	0	–		–		0	0
Rubin Kazan	Total		14	2	0	0	7	0	–		21	2
Career total			275	49	23	3	39	5	6	0	343	57

=== International ===
As of 1 March 2012

Appearances and goals by national team and year
National team	Year	Apps	Goals
Russia	2005	4	0
Russia	2006	7	0
Russia	2007	8	1
Russia	2008	9	1
Russia	2009	4	2
Russia	2010	5	1
Russia	2011	8	1
Russia	2012	1	0
Total		46	6

Scores and results list Russia's goal tally first, score column indicates score after each Bilyaletdinov goal.

List of international goals scored by Diniyar Bilyaletdinov
#	Date	Venue	Opponent	Score	Result	Competition
1	2007-11-17	Ramat Gan Stadium, Ramat Gan, Israel	Israel	1–1	1–2	Euro 2008 Qualification
2	2008-05-23	Lokomotiv Stadium (Moscow), Moscow, Russia	Kazakhstan	4–0	6–0	Friendly
3	2009-11-14	Luzhniki Stadium, Moscow, Russia	Slovenia	1–0	2–1	2010 FIFA World Cup qualification
4	2009-11-14	Luzhniki Stadium, Moscow, Russia	Slovenia	2–0	2–1	2010 FIFA World Cup qualification
5	2010-03-03	Stadion ETO, Győr, Hungary	Hungary	1–1	1–1	Friendly
6	2011-10-11	Luzhniki Stadium, Moscow, Russia	Andorra	6–0	6–0	UEFA Euro 2012 qualifying

== Honours ==
=== Club ===
Lokomotiv Moscow

- Russian Premier League: 2004
- Russian Cup: 2006–07
- Russian Super Cup: 2005
- CIS Cup: 2005

=== International ===
Russia

- UEFA European Championship bronze medalist: 2008

=== Individual ===
- Everton Goal of the Season: 2009–10 vs. Manchester United
