= 2009–10 Everton F.C. season =

English football club season

Everton
2009–10 season
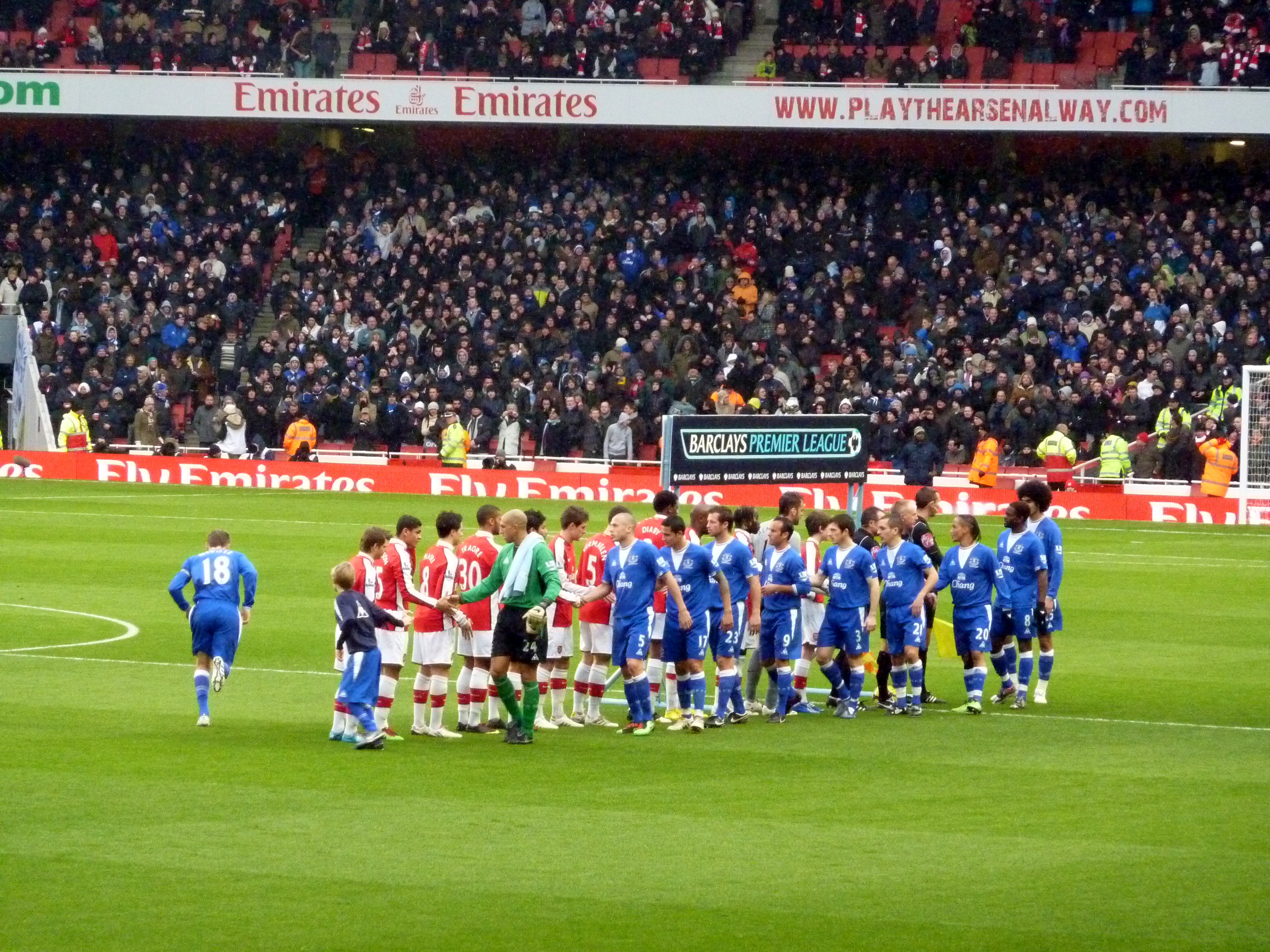
- Arsenal and Everton players shake hands before their Premier League game at the Emirates
- Chairman: Bill Kenwright
- Manager: David Moyes
- Premier League: 8th
- FA Cup: Fourth round
- League Cup: Fourth round
- UEFA Europa League: Round of 32
- Top goalscorer: League: Louis Saha (13); All: Louis Saha (15)
- Highest home attendance: 39,652 (29 Nov v Liverpool)
- Lowest home attendance: 18,242 (17 Dec v BATE Borisov)
- Average home league attendance: League: 36,725; All: 34,277
Home colours	Away colours	Third colours

The 2009–10 season of Everton F.C. was Everton's 18th season in the Premier League and 56th consecutive season in the top division of English football. The club began their preseason friendly schedule on 10 July 2009 and concluded the summer friendlies on 7 August. Everton began their Premier League season at home in Goodison Park with a 6–1 defeat by Arsenal, the worst defeat by the North London side since a 7–0 loss in 2005. Everton's poor form continued throughout most of the first half of the season; they found themselves in 16th place, only two points clear of the relegation zone, at Christmas, though their league form improved significantly from that time. Everton entered the League Cup in the Third round against Hull City, a match they won, but the club was eliminated in the next round by Tottenham Hotspur. They also entered the FA Cup in the third round proper and were eliminated in the fourth round by Birmingham City.

The Toffees also qualified for the Europa League, for which Everton qualified based upon their fifth-place finish in the 2008–09 Premier League, entering in the play-off round; Everton advanced through the group stage and were ultimately defeated 4–2 on aggregate by Portuguese club Sporting CP in the Round of 32. Everton finished the Premier League season in eighth place, failing to qualify for any European competitions for the first time since the 2005–06 season. The club ended the league campaign very strongly, suffering only two defeats in their final 24 league games.

== Matches ==
=== Pre-season friendlies ===
10 July	Bury	2–1	Everton	Bury
19:45	Lowe 64'; Sodje 69'	Report	Saha 23'	Stadium: Gigg Lane; Referee: Karl Evans

18 July	Rochdale	1–4	Everton	Rochdale
15:00	Dagnall 29' (pen.)	Report	Duffy 7'; Dawson 24' (o.g.); Jô 32', 78'	Stadium: Spotland Stadium

25 July	River Plate (Argentina)	1–0	Everton	Edmonton, Alberta
13:30	Ortega 27'	Report		Stadium: Commonwealth Stadium; Attendance: 15,800; Referee: Mauricio Navarro

29 July	MLS All-Stars (United States)	1–1 (3–4 p)	Everton	Sandy, Utah
19:50	Davis 26'	Report	Saha 12'	Stadium: Rio Tinto Stadium; Attendance: 20,120; Referee: Ricardo Salazar
	Penalties
	Donovan (penalty scored); Davis (penalty missed); Arnaud (penalty missed); Johnson (penalty scored); Casey (penalty scored); Ljungberg (penalty missed)		(penalty missed) Vaughan; (penalty missed) Jô; (penalty scored) Baines; (penalty scored) Neville; (penalty scored) Lescott; (penalty scored) Rodwell

2 August	Coventry City	2–2	Everton	Coventry
12:30	Doyle 35'; Gunnarsson 89'	Report	Cahill 16'; Baxter 85'	Stadium: Ricoh Arena; Referee: Peter Walton

4 August	Blackpool	2–1	Everton	Blackpool
19:45	Vaughan 5'; Euell 30'	Report	Jô 17'	Stadium: Bloomfield Road; Attendance: 8,859; Referee: Neil Swarbrick

7 August	Everton	2–1	(Spain) Málaga	Liverpool
20:00	Saha 15'; Osman 20'	Report	Luque 47'	Stadium: Goodison Park; Attendance: 20,098; Referee: Howard Webb

=== Premier League ===
==== August ====
Everton began its Premier League season at home at Goodison Park against Arsenal on 15 August 2009. The Toffees were never competitive in the match and were defeated 6–1, the worst opening day loss by Everton and tied for worst opening day loss in Premier League history. Everton's second match was due to be away to Manchester City, but the match was postponed due to Everton's Europa League match with Sigma Olomouc. In their second Premier League match, Everton fell 1–0 at Turf Moor against Premier League newcomers Burnley, again producing little in the way of offence, including a Saha penalty kick that missed to the right. The losing streak was halted in the third match of the season when Everton defeated Wigan Athletic at Goodison Park, the game-winner coming in the form of a second-half, Leighton Baines penalty kick during injury time.

==== September ====
The next match, in September, saw Everton take an early lead at Craven Cottage, but captain Phil Neville went down to a knee injury in the second half as the Toffees fell 2–1 to Fulham. Neville, who tore the posterior cruciate ligament in his knee, is expected to avoid surgery and return to play after a three-month layoff. Everton then returned to Goodison Park and, behind two goals from Louis Saha and one from Joseph Yobo, easily dispatched of Blackburn Rovers, 3–0. Everton then played away to Portsmouth and came away with a 1–0 victory thanks to Saha's fifth goal of the year. Steven Pienaar was carried off on a stretcher in the 60th minute with a knee injury after a hard challenge by Portsmouth captain Aaron Mokoena.

==== October ====
Everton started October with a home match against Stoke City; the match was drawn 1–1, the game-tying goal coming from Leon Osman in the 55th minute, only five minutes after Stoke's Robert Huth had opened the scoring. In their next match, at home at Goodison Park, Everton drew with Wolverhampton Wanderers 1–1, with goals coming from Kevin Doyle and Diniyar Bilyaletdinov, his first goal for the club for the latter. Everton's run of bad form then continued with a 3–2 loss away to Bolton Wanderers. The match did, however, see Lucas Neill's first start for the club, and he assisted on both of Everton's goals, which were scored by Louis Saha and Marouane Fellaini, respectively. In their next match, Everton hosted Aston Villa, with the result being 1–1. Bilyaletdinov opened the scoring during first half injury time, but the goal was cancelled out with John Carew's 47th-minute strike. Both teams ended the game with ten players after Bilyaletdinov and Carlos Cuéllar were sent off in the last five minutes.

==== November ====
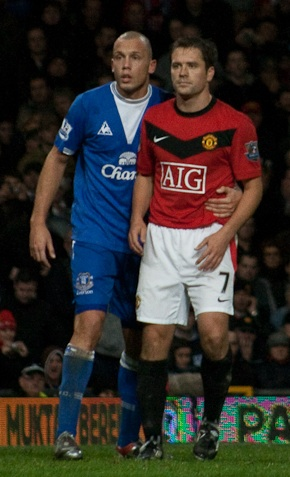
Johnny Heitinga with Michael Owen of Manchester United.

Moving into November, Everton ended its four match winless streak with a 2–1 victory over West Ham at the Boleyn Ground with Everton's goals coming from striker Louis Saha and young midfielder Dan Gosling. This would however be Everton's last win in November with losses occurring against Manchester United, Hull City and Merseyside Derby rivals Liverpool. In the game against Manchester United at Old Trafford, Everton were defeated 0–3 with goals from Darren Fletcher, Michael Carrick and Antonio Valencia. The match against Hull City played midweek at the KC Stadium again saw Everton lose 2–3 with Hull's goals all coming in the first half and Everton's two in the second half. Hull saw goals scored from Stephen Hunt, Andy Dawson and Dean Marney while Everton's goal was scored by Louis Saha from the penalty spot while the other goal was a Kamil Zayatte own goal as well as the return of Steven Pienaar. In the next, The Merseyside Derby, Everton hosted Liverpool in a match that saw the return of some of Everton's better form despite losing the match 0–2 with goals for Liverpool coming from a Joseph Yobo own goal and Dirk Kuyt.

==== December ====
In Everton's first match of December they came from 2 goals down to draw 2–2 with Tottenham Hotspur at Goodison Park. After going down to goals from Jermain Defoe and Michael Dawson, Everton started their comeback through Louis Saha and then Tim Cahill's equaliser and finished after Tim Howard saved the point for Everton by stopping a late penalty by Defoe. Everton's next match was a 3–3 draw away to league-leaders Chelsea in which Everton twice came from behind to tie the score. Saha put Everton ahead in the 12th minute when his header deflected off the post and then the back of Petr Čech for an own goal. Didier Drogba and Nicolas Anelka put Chelsea ahead but Yakubu drew the score in the fifth minute of first half injury time. Drogba, who threatened throughout the match as Chelsea held 65% of possession, put away his second of the match in the 59th minute. However, the draw was sealed in the 64th minute when a Drogba clear hit the back of Saha and bounced into the Chelsea goal. The Toffees earned the third straight draw the following week against Birmingham City – who entered the match on a five match winning streak, the best in the Premier League at that time – at Goodison Park. Compared to their previous match against Chelsea, the Birmingham match was a role reversal for Everton, who had more corners, 7–3, and attempted more shots, 17–2, than Birmingham, but were unable to break through after Bilyaletdinov's fifth-minute strike. On the day, Everton's finishing was poor as evidenced by 14 of their 17 total attempted shots being off target.

If you look at how we played today, the players will not be in [relegation trouble] come the end of the season.

— David Moyes, 26 December, following the draw at Sunderland

The club earned their fourth consecutive Premier League draw of the season at the Stadium of Light on 26 December. Both teams played well, and Sunderland clung to a one-goal lead for much of the match after Darren Bent converted a header from Kenwyne Jones in the 17th minute. Everton pressed hard in the remainder of the match, particularly during the second half, and were rewarded in the 85th minute when Fellaini finished a Tony Hibbert cross. In their final match of 2009, on 28 December, the Blues were able to end they calendar year on a positive note as they earned their first win in over seven weeks – and first victory at home in over three months – defeating Burnley at Goodison Park, 2–0. Both goals game last in the second half, James Vaughan tallying in the 83rd minute – his first goal in two years – and Steven Pienaar during extra time. Both scores came after Stephen Jordan was sent off in the 62nd minute when he earned his second yellow card of the day. Burnley manager Owen Coyle criticised the referee after the match, believing the Everton's go-ahead goal had been scored with Yakubu in an offside position.

==== January ====
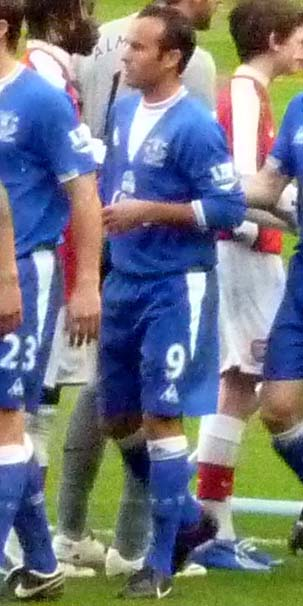
Landon Donovan before his Premier League debut against Arsenal, 9 January.

The Toffees kicked off 2010 on 9 January with an impressive 2–2 draw away to Arsenal, who had defeated Everton 6–1 at Goodison Park in the season opener. It was one of only two matches played in the Premier League on the weekend, the rest of which were cancelled due to a nationwide blizzard. New American loanee Landon Donovan made his debut, harassing Arsenal defender Armand Traoré throughout the match – and tallied an assist in the 12th minute on a curling corner kick that was headed past Manuel Almunia by Leon Osman. Denílson levelled the score in the 28th when his shot deflected off Osman. Everton again took the lead when Pienaar struck put one away in the 81st. When it appeared that Everton were going to get their first win at Emirates Stadium, but a Tomáš Rosický shot deflected off Lucas Neill and into the twine as Arsenal were able to salvage the draw. Easily Everton's strongest performance to that point of the season, Arsenal manager Arsène Wenger praised the Toffees after the match, saying "We gained one point, because we were closer to losing this game than winning it... For the biggest part of this match Everton were more dangerous, sharper than us."

==== Results ====
15 August	Everton	1–6	Arsenal	Liverpool
17:30 BST	Saha 90+2'	Report	Denílson 26'; Vermaelen 37'; Gallas 41'; Fàbregas 48', 70'; Eduardo 89'	Stadium: Goodison Park; Attendance: 39,309; Referee: Mark Halsey

Postponed	Manchester City	P – P	Everton	Manchester
		due to a UEFA play-off fixture		Stadium: City of Manchester Stadium

22 August	Burnley	1–0	Everton	Burnley
15:00 BST	Elliott 34'	Report		Stadium: Turf Moor; Attendance: 19,983; Referee: Phil Dowd

30 August	Everton	2–1	Wigan Athletic	Liverpool
15:00 BST	Saha 61'; Baines 90+4' (pen.)	Report	Scharner 56'	Stadium: Goodison Park; Attendance: 35,122; Referee: Lee Probert

13 September	Fulham	2–1	Everton	London
16:15 BST	Konchesky 57'; Duff 79'	Report	Cahill 33'	Stadium: Craven Cottage; Attendance: 24,191; Referee: Peter Walton

19 September	Everton	3–0	Blackburn Rovers	Liverpool
15:00 BST	Saha 21', 53'; Yobo 57'	Report		Stadium: Goodison Park; Attendance: 35,546; Referee: Lee Mason

26 September	Portsmouth	0–1	Everton	Portsmouth
12:45 BST		Report	Saha 42'	Stadium: Fratton Park; Attendance: 18,116; Referee: Alan Wiley

3 October	Everton	1–1	Stoke City	Liverpool
15:00 BST	Osman 55'	Report	Huth 49'	Stadium: Goodison Park; Attendance: 36,753; Referee: Andre Marriner

17 October	Everton	1–1	Wolverhampton Wanderers	Liverpool
15:00 BST	Bilyaletdinov 88'	Report	Doyle 75'	Stadium: Goodison Park; Attendance: 39,319; Referee: Stuart Attwell

24 October	Bolton Wanderers	3–2	Everton	Horwich
15:00 BST	Lee 16'; Cahill 27'; Klasnić 86'	Report	Saha 32'; Fellaini 55'	Stadium: Reebok Stadium; Attendance: 21,547; Referee: Phil Dowd

31 October	Everton	1–1	Aston Villa	Liverpool
15:00 BST	Bilyaletdinov 45+1'	Report	Carew 47'	Stadium: Goodison Park; Attendance: 36,648; Referee: Lee Probert

8 November	West Ham United	1–2	Everton	London
15:00 GMT	Hibbert 65' (o.g.)	Report	Saha 27'; Gosling 64'	Stadium: Boleyn Ground; Attendance: 32,466; Referee: Alan Wiley

21 November	Manchester United	3–0	Everton	Manchester
17:30 GMT	Fletcher 35'; Carrick 67'; Valencia 76'	Report		Stadium: Old Trafford; Attendance: 75,169; Referee: Steve Bennett

25 November	Hull City	3–2	Everton	Kingston upon Hull
19:45 GMT	Hunt 9'; Dawson 20'; Marney 28'	Report	Zayatte 49' (o.g.); Saha 65' (pen.)	Stadium: KC Stadium; Attendance: 24,685; Referee: Martin Atkinson

29 November	Everton	0–2	Liverpool	Liverpool
13:30 GMT		Report	Yobo 11' (o.g.); Kuyt 79'	Stadium: Goodison Park; Attendance: 39,652; Referee: Alan Wiley

6 December	Everton	2–2	Tottenham Hotspur	Liverpool
15:00 GMT	Saha 78'; Cahill 86'	Report	Defoe 47'; Dawson 59'	Stadium: Goodison Park; Attendance: 34,003; Referee: Andre Marriner

12 December	Chelsea	3–3	Everton	London
15:00 GMT	Drogba 18', 59'; Anelka 23'	Report	Čech 13' (o.g.); Yakubu 45+5'; Saha 64'	Stadium: Stamford Bridge; Attendance: 41,579; Referee: Phil Dowd

20 December	Everton	1–1	Birmingham City	Liverpool
15:00 GMT	Bilyaletdinov 5'	Report	Larsson 22'	Stadium: Goodison Park; Attendance: 33,660; Referee: Stuart Attwell

26 December	Sunderland	1–1	Everton	Sunderland
15:00 GMT	Bent 17'	Report	Fellaini 85'	Stadium: Stadium of Light; Attendance: 46,990; Referee: Martin Atkinson

28 December	Everton	2–0	Burnley	Liverpool
15:00 GMT	Vaughan 83'; Pienaar 90+2'	Report		Stadium: Goodison Park; Attendance: 39,419; Referee: Howard Webb

9 January	Arsenal	2–2	Everton	London
15:00 GMT	Denílson 28'; Rosický 90+2'	Report	Osman 12'; Pienaar 81'	Stadium: Emirates Stadium; Attendance: 60,053; Referee: Peter Walton

16 January	Everton	2–0	Manchester City	Liverpool
17:30 GMT	Pienaar 37'; Saha 45+4'	Report		Stadium: Goodison Park; Attendance: 37,378; Referee: Andre Marriner

27 January	Everton	2–0	Sunderland	Liverpool
20:00 GMT	Cahill 6'; Donovan 17'	Report		Stadium: Goodison Park; Attendance: 32,163; Referee: Phil Dowd

30 January	Wigan Athletic	0–1	Everton	Wigan
15:00 GMT		Report	Cahill 84'	Stadium: DW Stadium; Attendance: 16,869; Referee: Alan Wiley

6 February	Liverpool	1–0	Everton	Liverpool
12:45 GMT	Kuyt 55'	Report		Stadium: Anfield; Attendance: 44,316; Referee: Martin Atkinson

10 February	Everton	2–1	Chelsea	Liverpool
20:00 GMT	Saha 32', 74'	Report	Malouda 16'	Stadium: Goodison Park; Attendance: 36,411; Referee: Alan Wiley

20 February	Everton	3–1	Manchester United	Liverpool
15:00 GMT	Bilyaletdinov 19'; Gosling 76'; Rodwell 90'	Report	Berbatov 16'	Stadium: Goodison Park; Attendance: 39,448; Referee: Howard Webb

28 February	Tottenham Hotspur	2–1	Everton	London
13:00 GMT	Pavlyuchenko 10'; Modrić 27'	Report	Yakubu 54'	Stadium: White Hart Lane; Attendance: 35,912; Referee: Steve Bennett

7 March	Everton	5–1	Hull City	Liverpool
16:00 GMT	Arteta 17', 39'; Garcia 52' (o.g.); Donovan 82'; Rodwell 86'	Report	Cairney 32'	Stadium: Goodison Park; Attendance: 34,682; Referee: Lee Mason

13 March	Birmingham City	2–2	Everton	Birmingham
15:00 GMT	Jerome 26'; Gardner 52'	Report	Anichebe 19'; Yakubu 22'	Stadium: Saint Andrew's; Attendance: 24,579; Referee: Lee Probert

20 March	Everton	2–0	Bolton Wanderers	Liverpool
15:00 GMT	Arteta 72'; Pienaar 89'	Report		Stadium: Goodison Park; Attendance: 36,503; Referee: Alan Wiley

24 March	Manchester City	0–2	Everton	Manchester
19:45 GMT	Mancini (red card) 90+1'	Report	Cahill 33'; Arteta 85'; Moyes (red card) 90+1'	Stadium: City of Manchester Stadium; Attendance: 45,708; Referee: Peter Walton

27 March	Wolverhampton Wanderers	0–0	Everton	Wolverhampton
15:00 GMT		Report		Stadium: Molineux Stadium; Attendance: 28,000; Referee: Mike Jones

4 April	Everton	2–2	West Ham United	Liverpool
16:00 BST	Bilyaletdinov 24'; Yakubu 85'	Report	Da Costa 60'; Ilan 87'	Stadium: Goodison Park; Attendance: 37,451; Referee: Howard Webb

14 April	Aston Villa	2–2	Everton	Birmingham
15:00 BST	Agbonlahor 72'; Jagielka 90+1' (o.g.)	Report	Cahill 22', 73'	Stadium: Villa Park; Attendance: 38,729; Referee: Martin Atkinson

17 April	Blackburn Rovers	2–3	Everton	Blackburn
15:00 BST	Nzonzi 69'; Roberts 81'	Report	Arteta 3' (pen.); Yakubu 78'; Cahill 90'	Stadium: Ewood Park; Attendance: 27,022; Referee: Andre Marriner

25 April	Everton	2–1	Fulham	Liverpool
15:00 BST	Smalling 49' (o.g.); Arteta 90+4'	Report	Nevland 36'	Stadium: Goodison Park; Attendance: 35,578; Referee: Lee Mason

1 May	Stoke City	0–0	Everton	Stoke-on-Trent
15:00 BST		Report		Stadium: Britannia Stadium; Attendance: 27,579; Referee: Howard Webb

9 May	Everton	1–0	Portsmouth	Liverpool
15:00 BST	Bilyaletdinov 90+4'	Report		Stadium: Goodison Park; Attendance: 38,730; Referee: Peter Walton

==== Final league table ====
Pos	Team	Pld	W	D	L	GF	GA	GD	Pts	Qualification or relegation
6	Aston Villa	38	17	13	8	52	39	+13	64	Qualification for the Europa League play-off round (Note: Since Manchester United won the League Cup and then qualified for the Champions League, their spot in the Europa League was passed down to the 6th-placed team. The 6th-placed Aston Villa was coincidentally also the League Cup runners-up.)
7	Liverpool	38	18	9	11	61	35	+26	63	Qualification for the Europa League third qualifying round (Note: Originally Portsmouth qualified for the third qualifying round of the Europa League as the FA Cup runners-up, replacing the winners, Champions League-qualified Chelsea. However, they failed to apply for a UEFA licence. Therefore, Liverpool as the best placed team not qualified for the European competitions took their place.)
8	Everton	38	16	13	9	60	49	+11	61	
9	Birmingham City	38	13	11	14	38	47	−9	50	
10	Blackburn Rovers	38	13	11	14	41	55	−14	50	

Source: Barclays Premier League

=== FA Cup ===
Everton entered the 2009–10 FA Cup at the third round and were drawn at home against Carlisle United of League One. It was a closely fought match in which Carlisle United matched Everton for much of the match. James Vaughan scored the opening tally against the run of play in the twelfth minute, but Carlisle's Kevan Hurst equalised only six minutes later. Carlisle nearly took the lead in the seventieth minute, but the Danny Livesey attempt was partially saved by Tim Howard and rang the crossbar. Everton were finally able to take hold of the match in the eight-second minute when Phil Neville knocked in the winner. Leighton Baines sealed the match with a penalty shot that had been earned by substitute Kieran Agard in the fifth minute of extra time. For the Fourth round, Everton were drawn to face Birmingham City, who won their third round replay with Nottingham Forest. Everton were unable to duplicate the FA Cup run of the previous season as they were eliminated by Birmingham City, 2–1, in front of their home crowd at Goodison Park. Christian Benítez opened the scoring for Birmingham in the seventh minute, and Barry Ferguson doubled the lead in the 40th minute. Leon Osman added a goal for Everton, but for the Toffees, it was too little too late.

2 January Third round	Everton	3–1	Carlisle United	Liverpool
15:00 GMT	Vaughan 12'; Cahill 82'; Baines 90+5' (pen.)	Report	Hurst 18'	Stadium: Goodison Park; Attendance: 31,196; Referee: Moss

23 January Fourth round	Everton	1–2	Birmingham City	Liverpool
15:00 GMT	Osman 56'		Benítez 7'; Ferguson 40'	Stadium: Goodison Park; Attendance: 30,875; Referee: Webb

=== Football League Cup ===
Everton entered the League Cup at the third round stage. They were drawn away against Hull City; the game was played on 22 September. Everton qualified for the fourth round of the competition with a 4–0 victory away at Hull with goals from Jô, Dan Gosling, Leon Osman and Yakubu, who made his first start on return from his achilles injury. The game was also the debut of new signing Lucas Neill who came on as a second-half substitute. Everton, debuting their all-purple alternate kit, were eliminated from the League Cup in their second match, a 2–0 loss away to Tottenham Hotspur in the Round of 16.

23 September Third round	Hull City	0–4	Everton	Kingston upon Hull
19:45 BST		Report	Yakubu 10'; Jô 19'; Gosling 23'; Osman 56'	Stadium: KC Stadium; Attendance: 13,558; Referee: Steve Bennett

27 October Fourth round	Tottenham Hotspur	2–0	Everton	London
20:00 BST	Huddlestone 31'; Keane 57'	Report		Stadium: White Hart Lane; Attendance: 35,843; Referee: Lee Mason

=== Europa League ===
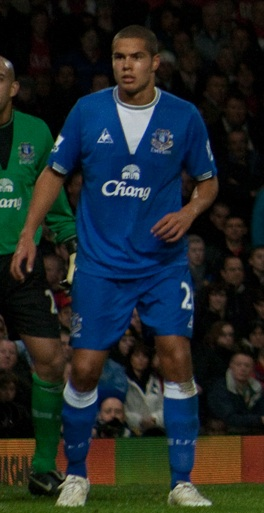
Jack Rodwell made his European debut against Sigma Olomouc and tallied two goals.

Everton opened play in the Europa League in the play-off round and were drawn against Czech club Sigma Olomouc, who finished fourth in the 2008–09 Gambrinus liga. Sigma had already advanced through two rounds of the Europa League, having dispatched of Icelandic club Fram in the second qualifying round and Scottish club Aberdeen in the third qualifying round by aggregate scores of 3–1 and 8–1, respectively. Everton took a 4–0 lead at home in the first leg. In the return leg in Olomouc, Tony Hibbert was sent off in the seventh minute, but Everton were able to hold strong, earning a 1–1 draw for the 5–1 aggregate victory.

The Toffees were next drawn into Group I in the group stage with Greek club AEK Athens, Belarusian club BATE Borisov, and Portuguese club Benfica. Everton opened their first match in the group stage with a 4–0 home victory against AEK Athens. Everton then continued their perfect start to the group stage with a 2–1, come-from-behind victory over BATE Borisov, with goals from Marouane Fellaini and Tim Cahill cancelling out Dzmitry Likhtarovich's 16th-minute opener. The Toffees, heavily depleted by injuries, were handed their first loss of Europa League play in their third Group Stage match away to Benfica, losing 5–0, the worst defeat Everton had ever suffered during European play. This loss was followed a fortnight later by a second loss to Benfica in Everton's home tie, the scoreline ending 2–0 and goals coming from Javier Saviola and Óscar Cardozo, who each had already scored two goals apiece in Benfica's previous win over Everton. In their next match, Everton travelled to Athens to play AEK Athens, winning the match 1–0 thanks to Bilyaletdinov's 6th-minute goal. The win allowed Everton to qualify for the knockout stage with one group stage game to spare thanks to Benfica's victory away to BATE. The win, however, was somewhat soured by injuries suffered by Jô, Sylvain Distin and Dan Gosling. In the Toffees' final group stage match, with several senior starters injured and the club having already secured passage into the knockout rounds, David Moyes fielded a young side against BATE. In all, seven teenagers saw action on the evening, including five who received their first senior cap. In the match, two Everton records were set: Tony Hibbert set the club record for European caps with 20, and Jake Bidwell set the record for youngest senior cap in European play at only 16 years and 271 days. BATE was able to control possession for much of the match and came away as victors in their final European match of the season.

For the Round of 32, Everton were drawn against Portuguese side Sporting CP, with the winner advancing to face the winner of Atlético Madrid–Galatasaray. As a result of UEFA regulations, Everton were forced to move the first leg from the regular Thursday evening schedule to an early Tuesday kickoff, which resulted in less than 30,000 in attendance. The first leg was won 2–1 by Everton on the strength of goals by Sylvain Distin and Steven Pienaar. Distin, however, was penalised with a red card in the 85th minutes for a hard tackle in the box, which was converted from the penalty spot by Miguel Veloso. For the return leg, Everton's Nigerian contingent of Yakubu and Yobo were both initially denied entry into Portugal as a result of passport issues stemming from Portuguese foreign relations with Nigeria, but both players arrived via Amsterdam on the morning of the match. Sporting entered their home leg against Everton on a seven-match winless streak in all competitions, but they possessed the ball attacked the Everton back line early and often, defeating Everton 3–0 on the day and 4–2 on aggregate. The Toffees only managed four attempted shots in the match, only one of which was on target. Conversely, Tim Howard had a very busy night, facing nine shots on target and saving six. Miguel Veloso scored his second goal in as many games against Everton in the 65th minute, putting Sporting in control of the tie. Everton's hopes of forcing extra time remained alive after Pedro Mendes' 76th minute shot deflected off Jack Rodwell and into the net. As Everton put pressure on Sporting in injury time, Sporting put away the match on a counter-attack score by Matías Fernández.

20 August Play-off Round	Everton (England)	4–0	(Czech Republic) Sigma Olomouc	Liverpool
20:00 BST	Saha 33', 72'; Rodwell 39', 53'	Report		Stadium: Goodison Park; Attendance: 27,433; Referee: Lucílio Batista (Portugal)

27 August Play-off Round	Sigma Olomouc (Czech Republic)	1–1	(England) Everton	Olomouc
17:00 BST	Šultes 79'	Report	Pienaar 42'	Stadium: Andrův stadion Attendance: 10,212; Referee: Fredy Fautrel (France)

17 September Group stage	Everton (England)	4–0	(Greece) AEK Athens	Liverpool
20:05 BST	Yobo 10'; Distin 17'; Pienaar 37'; Jô 82'	Report		Stadium: Goodison Park; Attendance: 26,747; Referee: Robert Małek (Poland)

1 October Group Stage	BATE Borisov (Belarus)	1–2	(England) Everton	Minsk
18:00 BST	Likhtarovich 16'	Report	Fellaini 67'; Cahill 77'	Stadium: Dinamo Stadium; Attendance: 23,000; Referee: Cristian Balaj (Romania)

22 October Group Stage	Benfica (Portugal)	5–0	(England) Everton	Lisbon
18:00 BST	Saviola 14', 83'; Cardozo 47', 48'; Luisão 52'	Report		Stadium: Estádio da Luz; Attendance: 44,534; Referee: Nikolai Ivanov (Russia)

5 November Group Stage	Everton (England)	0–2	(Portugal) Benfica	Liverpool
20:05 GMT		Report	Saviola 63'; Cardozo 76'	Stadium: Goodison Park; Attendance: 30,790; Referee: Saïd Ennjimi (France)

2 December Group Stage	AEK Athens (Greece)	0–1	(England) Everton	Athens
18:00 GMT		Report	Bilyaletdinov 6'	Stadium: Olympic Stadium; Attendance: 15,000; Referee: Claudio Circhetta (Switzerland)

17 December Group Stage	Everton (England)	0–1	(Belarus) BATE	Liverpool
20:05 GMT		Report	Yurevich 75'	Stadium: Goodison Park; Attendance: 18,242; Referee: Selçuk Dereli (Turkey)

16 February Round of 32	Everton (England)	2–1	(Portugal) Sporting CP	Liverpool
17:45 GMT	Pienaar 34'; Distin 48'	Report	Veloso 86' (pen.)	Stadium: Goodison Park; Attendance: 28,131; Referee: Darko Čeferin (Slovenia)

25 February Round of 32	Sporting CP (Portugal)	3–0	(England) Everton	Lisbon
20:05 GMT	Veloso 65'; Mendes 76'; Fernández 90+4'	Report		Stadium: Estádio José Alvalade; Attendance: 17,609; Referee: Alon Yefet (Israel)

== Players ==
=== First team squad ===
Updated 15 March 2010.

Note: Flags indicate national team as defined under FIFA eligibility rules; some limited exceptions apply. Players may hold more than one non-FIFA nationality.

No.	Pos.	Nation	Player
1	GK	ENG	Carlo Nash
2	DF	ENG	Tony Hibbert
3	DF	ENG	Leighton Baines
4	DF	NGR	Joseph Yobo
5	DF	NED	John Heitinga
6	DF	ENG	Phil Jagielka
7	MF	RUS	Diniyar Bilyaletdinov
8	FW	FRA	Louis Saha
10	MF	ESP	Mikel Arteta
12	GK	SCO	Iain Turner
14	FW	ENG	James Vaughan
15	DF	FRA	Sylvain Distin
17	MF	AUS	Tim Cahill (Note: Cahill was born in Sydney, Australia, but also qualified to represent Samoa internationally through his mother, England through his father, and the Republic of Ireland through his grandparents, and represented Samoa (then called Western Samoa) at U-20 level and unsuccessfully attempted to overturn a FIFA ruling that prevented him from representing the Republic of Ireland before a change in FIFA's eligibility rules in 2004 allowed Cahill to make his international debut for Australia in March 2004.)
18	MF	ENG	Phil Neville (captain)
19	MF	ENG	Dan Gosling
20	MF	RSA	Steven Pienaar
21	MF	ENG	Leon Osman
22	FW	NGR	Yakubu
23	DF	SUI	Philippe Senderos (on loan from Arsenal)

No.	Pos.	Nation	Player
24	GK	USA	Tim Howard
25	MF	BEL	Marouane Fellaini
26	MF	ENG	Jack Rodwell
28	FW	NGR	Victor Anichebe
29	MF	ENG	Adam Forshaw
30	GK	ENG	John Ruddy
31	DF	IRL	Séamus Coleman
32	DF	ENG	Luke Garbutt
33	DF	ENG	James McCarten
34	DF	IRL	Shane Duffy (Note: Duffy was born in Derry, Northern Ireland, and represented Northern Ireland at U-16, U-17, U-19, U-21 and B level and was called up to the senior squad without playing, but also qualified to represent the Republic of Ireland through his father and represented the Republic of Ireland at U-19 and U-21 level before making his international debut for the Republic of Ireland in June 2014.)
35	FW	ENG	Kieran Agard
36	DF	ENG	Jake Bidwell
37	FW	ENG	Jose Baxter
38	MF	ENG	James Wallace
39	MF	ENG	Hope Akpan (Note: Akpan was born in Liverpool, England, but also qualified to represent Nigeria through his parents and made his international debut for Nigeria in October 2014.)
40	FW	ENG	Conor McAleny
43	DF	GER	Shkodran Mustafi
44	MF	WAL	Nathan Craig
45	DF	COD	Aristote Nsiala

=== Left club during season ===
Note: Flags indicate national team as defined under FIFA eligibility rules; some limited exceptions apply. Players may hold more than one non-FIFA nationality.

No.	Pos.	Nation	Player
5	DF	ENG	Joleon Lescott (to Manchester City)
9	FW	USA	Landon Donovan (on loan from LA Galaxy)

No.	Pos.	Nation	Player
11	FW	BRA	Jô (on loan from Manchester City)
23	DF	AUS	Lucas Neill (to Galatasaray)

== Transfers ==
=== In ===
Player	From	Date	Fee
Shkodran Mustafi	Hamburger SV	July 2009	Free
Anton Peterlin	Ventura County Fusion	July 2009	Free
Cody Arnoux	Carolina Dynamo	August 2009	Undisclosed
Diniyar Bilyaletdinov	Lokomotiv Moscow	August 2009	Undisclosed
Sylvain Distin	Portsmouth	August 2009	Undisclosed
John Heitinga	Atlético Madrid	August 2009	£6m rising to £7m
Lucas Neill	Free agent	September 2009	Free transfer

=== Out ===
Player	To	Date	Fee
Nuno Valente	Retired	12 June 2009	Free
Andy van der Meyde	PSV	12 June 2009	Free
Lars Jacobsen	Blackburn Rovers	30 June 2009	Free
Segundo Castillo	Red Star Belgrade	30 June 2009	Loan finished
John Irving	Released	1 July 2009	Free
John Paul Kissock	Released	1 July 2009	Free
George Krenn	Released	August 2009	Free
Joleon Lescott	Manchester City	August 2009	£22M rising to £24M
Lucas Neill	Galatasaray	January 2010	£750,000

=== Loans in ===
Player	From	Date in	Return date
Jô	Manchester City	1 July 2009	January 2010
Landon Donovan	LA Galaxy	1 January 2010	March 2010
Philippe Senderos	Arsenal	23 January 2010	End of season

=== Loans out ===
Player	To	Date out	Return date
John Ruddy	Motherwell	24 July 2009	May 2010^{†}
Lukas Jutkiewicz	Motherwell	26 August 2009	May 2010^{†}
James Vaughan	Derby County	18 September 2009	9 October 2009^{‡}
Séamus Coleman	Blackpool	March 2010	April 2010 extended to End of Season
James Vaughan	Leicester City	March 2010	April 2010 extended to 3 May

Notes

- ^{†} Ruddy and Jutkiewicz were due to return to Everton in January 2010, but during January, their loans were extended to the end of the season.
- ^{‡} Vaughan was set to return in January – following a half-season loan to Derby – but returned on 9 October after less than a month on loan following surgery on a slight tear in his cartilage; Nigel Clough subsequently announced his desire to bring Vaughan back to Derby for a fresh half-season loan starting in January, but Vaughan later joined Leicester City on a one-month loan with an option of extending until the season's end, this option was taken up by Leicester on 12 April.

== Statistics ==
=== Appearances ===
No.	Pos	Nat	Player	Total		Premier League		League Cup		FA Cup		Europa League	
No.	Pos	Nat	Player	Apps	Goals	Apps	Goals	Apps	Goals	Apps	Goals	Apps	Goals
1	GK	(England) ENG	Carlo Nash	1	0	0	0	0	0	0	0	1	0
2	DF	(England) ENG	Tony Hibbert	30	0	17+3	0	2	0	1	0	7	0
3	DF	(England) ENG	Leighton Baines	48	2	37	1	1	0	2	1	8	0
4	DF	(Nigeria) NGR	Joseph Yobo	23	2	14+3	1	0	0	0	0	6	1
(5)	DF	(England) ENG	Joleon Lescott	1	0	1	0	0	0	0	0	0	0
5	DF	(Netherlands) NED	John Heitinga	35	0	29+2	0	2	0	2	0	0	0
6	DF	(England) ENG	Phil Jagielka	13	0	11+1	0	0	0	0	0	0+1	0
7	MF	(Russia) RUS	Diniyar Bilyaletdinov	33	7	16+7	6	1	0	2	0	6+1	1
8	FW	(France) FRA	Louis Saha	40	15	26+7	13	1	0	1	0	3+2	2
(9)	MF	(United States) USA	Landon Donovan	13	2	7+3	2	0	0	1	0	2	0
10	MF	(Spain) ESP	Mikel Arteta	16	6	11+2	6	0	0	0+1	0	2	0
11	FW	(Brazil) BRA	Jô	24	2	6+9	0	1+1	1	0	0	5+2	1
12	GK	(Scotland) SCO	Iain Turner	0	0	0	0	0	0	0	0	0	0
14	FW	(England) ENG	James Vaughan	11	2	0+8	1	0	0	1+1	1	0+1	0
15	DF	(France) FRA	Sylvain Distin	38	2	29	0	2	0	1	0	6	2
17	MF	(Australia) AUS	Tim Cahill	43	10	33	8	1	0	2	1	7	1
18	MF	(England) ENG	Phil Neville	29	0	22+1	0	0	0	2	0	4	0
19	MF	(England) ENG	Dan Gosling	20	3	3+8	2	2	1	0	0	6+1	0
20	MF	(South Africa) RSA	Steven Pienaar	38	7	30	4	0	0	2	0	6	3
21	MF	(England) ENG	Leon Osman	35	4	25+1	2	1	1	0+1	1	6+1	0
22	FW	(Nigeria) NGR	Yakubu	36	6	9+16	5	2	1	0	0	4+5	0
23	DF	(Australia) AUS	Lucas Neill	15	0	10+2	0	1+1	0	1	0	0	0
23	DF	(Switzerland) SUI	Philippe Senderos	3	0	1+1	0	0	0	0	0	1	0
24	GK	(United States) USA	Tim Howard	51	0	38	0	2	0	2	0	9	0
25	MF	(Belgium) BEL	Marouane Fellaini	34	3	20+3	2	1+1	0	2	0	7	1
26	MF	(England) ENG	Jack Rodwell	36	4	17+9	2	2	0	0	0	6+2	2
27	FW	(Poland) POL	Lukas Jutkiewicz	0	0	0	0	0	0	0	0	0	0
28	FW	(Nigeria) NGR	Victor Anichebe	11	1	6+5	1	0	0	0	0	0	0
29	MF	(England) ENG	Adam Forshaw	1	0	0	0	0	0	0	0	1	0
30	GK	(England) ENG	John Ruddy	0	0	0	0	0	0	0	0	0	0
31	DF	(Republic of Ireland) IRL	Séamus Coleman	7	0	0+3	0	0	0	0+1	0	3	0
34	DF	(Republic of Ireland) IRL	Shane Duffy	2	0	0	0	0	0	0	0	1+1	0
35	FW	(England) ENG	Kieran Agard	6	0	0+1	0	0+1	0	0+1	0	1+2	0
36	DF	(England) ENG	Jake Bidwell	1	0	0	0	0	0	0	0	1	0
37	FW	(England) ENG	Jose Baxter	7	0	0+2	0	0	0	0	0	1+4	0
38	MF	(England) ENG	James Wallace	1	0	0	0	0	0	0	0	0+1	0
39	MF	(England) ENG	Hope Akpan	1	0	0	0	0	0	0	0	0+1	0
43	DF	(Germany) GER	Shkodran Mustafi	1	0	0	0	0	0	0	0	0+1	0
44	MF	(England) ENG	Nathan Craig	1	0	0	0	0	0	0	0	0+1	0

=== Goalscorers ===
Name	Premier League	League Cup	FA Cup	Europa League	Total
Louis Saha	13	0	0	2	15
Tim Cahill	8	0	1	1	10
Steven Pienaar	4	0	0	3	7
Diniyar Bilyaletdinov	6	0	0	1	7
Mikel Arteta	6	0	0	0	6
Yakubu	5	1	0	0	6
Leon Osman	2	1	1	0	4
Jack Rodwell	2	0	0	2	4
Marouane Fellaini	2	0	0	1	3
Dan Gosling	2	1	0	0	3
Landon Donovan	2	0	0	0	2
Leighton Baines	1	0	1	0	2
James Vaughan	1	0	1	0	2
Joseph Yobo	1	0	0	1	2
Sylvain Distin	0	0	0	2	2
Jô	0	1	0	1	2
Victor Anichebe	1	0	0	0	1
Total	56	4	4	14	78

=== Disciplinary record ===
Last updated on 15 April 2010.

Number	Position	Name	Premier League		League Cup		FA Cup		Europa League		Total	
Number	Position	Name	Yellow card	Red card	Yellow card	Red card	Yellow card	Red card	Yellow card	Red card	Yellow card	Red card
2	DF	Tony Hibbert	1	0	1	0	0	0	2	1	4	1
3	DF	Leighton Baines	2	0	0	0	0	0	0	0	2	0
4	DF	Joseph Yobo	2	0	0	0	0	0	0	0	2	0
5	DF	John Heitinga	8	0	1	0	0	0	0	0	9	0
7	MF	Diniyar Bilyaletdinov	1	1	0	0	0	0	1	0	2	1
8	FW	Louis Saha	2	0	0	0	0	0	1	1	3	1
10	MF	Mikel Arteta	3	0	0	0	0	0	0	0	3	0
15	DF	Sylvain Distin	2	0	0	0	0	0	0	1	2	1
17	MF	Tim Cahill	8	0	1	0	1	0	2	0	12	0
18	MF	Phil Neville	1	0	0	1	0	0	1	0	3	0
19	MF	Dan Gosling	0	0	0	0	0	0	2	0	2	0
20	MF	Steven Pienaar	9	1	0	0	0	0	1	0	10	1
21	MF	Leon Osman	3	0	0	0	1	0	1	0	5	0
22	FW	Yakubu	1	0	0	0	0	0	1	0	2	0
24	GK	Tim Howard	2	0	0	0	0	0	1	0	3	0
25	MF	Marouane Fellaini	6	0	0	0	1	0	0	0	7	0
26	MF	Jack Rodwell	4	0	0	0	0	0	1	0	5	0
28	FW	Victor Anichebe	1	0	0	0	0	0	0	0	1	0
34	MF	Shane Duffy	0	0	0	0	0	0	1	0	1	0
37	FW	Jose Baxter	0	0	0	0	0	0	1	0	1	0
*9	MF	Landon Donovan	1	0	0	0	0	0	0	0	1	0
*23	DF	Lucas Neill	1	0	0	0	0	0	0	0	1	0
TOTALS			56	2	3	0	4	0	16	3	79	5

- Player no longer at club is denoted by *.

== End of Season Awards ==
The Everton annual end of season awards night was held on 4 May 2010 at the Liverpool Cathedral.

Award Winners on the night were:

- Player of the Season – Steven Pienaar
- The chairman's Blueblood Award – Tim Howard and Tim Cahill
- Goal of the Season – Diniyar Bilyaletdinov vs. Manchester United 20 February 2010
- Young Player of the Year – Jack Rodwell
- Players' Player of the Season – Leighton Baines
- Reserve Player of the Season – Shane Duffy
- Academy Player of the Season – Adam Davies
- Special Recognition Award – Keith Tamlin
- Everton Ladies Player of the Season – Jill Scott
