= 2015–16 FC Rubin Kazan season =

Rubin Kazan
2015–16 season
- Chairman: Ilsur Metshin
- Manager: Valeriy Chaly
- Stadium: Central Stadium; Kazan Arena
- Russian Premier League: 10th
- Russian Cup: Round of 32 v. SKA-Energiya Khabarovsk
- Europa League: Group stage
- Top goalscorer: League: Marko Dević (7); All: Marko Dević (9)
- Highest home attendance: 41,585 v. Liverpool; 5 November 2015
- Lowest home attendance: 4,231 v. Rabotnički; 27 August 2015
- Average home league attendance: 11,871; 21 May 2016
Home colours	Away colours	Third colours

The 2015–16 Rubin Kazan season was the 12th successive season that the club will play in the Russian Premier League, the highest tier of association football in Russia. Rubin was also taking part in the Russian Cup and the UEFA Europa League.

== Squad ==
Note: Flags indicate national team as defined under FIFA eligibility rules; some limited exceptions apply. Players may hold more than one non-FIFA nationality.

No.	Pos.	Nation	Player
1	GK	RUS	Sergei Ryzhikov
2	DF	RUS	Oleg Kuzmin (Captain)
3	DF	RUS	Elmir Nabiullin
5	DF	GEO	Solomon Kvirkvelia
6	MF	RUS	Ilzat Akhmetov
7	FW	RUS	Igor Portnyagin
8	MF	RUS	Maksim Batov
11	FW	UKR	Marko Dević
13	DF	SWE	Emil Bergström
14	MF	RUS	Diniyar Bilyaletdinov
15	MF	BLR	Syarhey Kislyak
16	GK	RUS	Timur Akmurzin
20	MF	CRO	Mijo Caktaš
21	DF	URU	Guillermo Cotugno

No.	Pos.	Nation	Player
22	FW	RUS	Vladimir Dyadyun
27	MF	RUS	Magomed Ozdoyev
29	MF	RUS	Shota Bibilov
30	MF	RUS	Vladimir Sobolev
31	MF	RUS	Denis Tkachuk
49	DF	RUS	Vitali Ustinov
61	MF	TUR	Gökdeniz Karadeniz
63	MF	RUS	Alisher Dzhalilov
65	DF	RUS	Maksim Zhestokov
77	MF	BUL	Blagoy Georgiev
79	DF	UKR	Andriy Pylyavskyi
88	DF	RUS	Ruslan Kambolov
91	GK	RUS	Yuri Nesterenko
99	FW	RUS	Maksim Kanunnikov

=== Out on loan ===
Note: Flags indicate national team as defined under FIFA eligibility rules; some limited exceptions apply. Players may hold more than one non-FIFA nationality.

No.	Pos.	Nation	Player
—	GK	RUS	Aleksandr Filtsov (at Arsenal Tula)
—	DF	RUS	Taras Burlak (at Krylia Sovetov Samara)
—	DF	RUS	Inal Getigezhev (at Gazovik Orenburg)
—	DF	COD	Chris Mavinga (at (France) Troyes)
—	DF	URU	Mauricio Lemos (at (Spain) Las Palmas)
—	MF	FRA	Yann M'Vila (at (England) Sunderland)

No.	Pos.	Nation	Player
—	MF	GHA	Wakaso Mubarak (at (Spain) Las Palmas)
—	MF	RUS	Albert Sharipov (at Tom Tomsk)
—	FW	RUS	Sergei Davydov (at KAMAZ Naberezhnye Chelny)
—	FW	IRI	Sardar Azmoun (at Rostov)
—	FW	CRO	Marko Livaja (at (Italy) Empoli)
—	FW	RUS	Dmitri Otstavnov (at Volga Ulyanovsk)

=== Reserves ===
Note: Flags indicate national team as defined under FIFA eligibility rules; some limited exceptions apply. Players may hold more than one non-FIFA nationality.

No.	Pos.	Nation	Player
19	FW	RUS	Mikhail Yakovlev
25	MF	UZB	Bobir Davlatov
28	FW	RUS	Mikhail Petrolay
35	DF	RUS	Kirill Lukyanchikov
36	MF	RUS	Maksim Bobrovskiy
40	DF	RUS	Danis Giniyatullin
41	DF	RUS	Sergei Doronin
42	DF	RUS	Amir Gavrilov
46	MF	RUS	Ruslan Kausarov
47	DF	RUS	Dmitri Gubanov
48	MF	RUS	Artur Nikolayev
54	MF	RUS	Erik Vasilyev
56	FW	RUS	Gevorg Arutyunyan
57	DF	RUS	Iskander Badriyev
62	FW	RUS	Artur Kovalik
64	FW	RUS	Nikita Tankov
70	GK	RUS	Yevgeni Shchetinin

No.	Pos.	Nation	Player
73	MF	RUS	Igor Nikolov
78	FW	RUS	Nikita Torgashov
79	FW	RUS	Nikita Vorona
80	DF	RUS	Yegor Sorokin
81	DF	RUS	Ilnur Safeyev
82	DF	RUS	Nikita Mikhailov
83	DF	RUS	Aleksandr Kuznetsov
84	MF	RUS	Andrei Mironov
86	FW	RUS	Timur Koblov
90	FW	RUS	Ilya Gilyazutdinov
92	MF	RUS	Almaz Sharafeev
94	DF	RUS	Ilya Shabanov
95	MF	RUS	Insar Salakhetdinov
96	MF	RUS	German Frolov
97	FW	RUS	Dmitri Kamenshchikov
98	GK	RUS	Anton Chernov

== Transfers ==
=== Summer ===
In: Note: Flags indicate national team as defined under FIFA eligibility rules; some limited exceptions apply. Players may hold more than one non-FIFA nationality.

No.	Pos.	Nation	Player
4	DF	URU	Mauricio Lemos (on loan from (Uruguay) Defensor Sporting)
8	DF	RUS	Maksim Batov (from (Russia) Amkar Perm)
9	FW	RUS	Ramil Sheydayev (on loan from (Russia) Zenit Saint Petersburg)
11	FW	UKR	Marko Dević (end of loan at (Qatar) Al Rayyan)
13	GK	IRI	Alireza Haghighi (end of loan to (Portugal) Penafiel)
14	MF	RUS	Diniyar Bilyaletdinov (from (Russia) Spartak Moscow, previously on loan at (Russia) Torpedo Moscow)
21	DF	URU	Guillermo Cotugno (from (Uruguay) Danubio, previously on loan)
27	MF	RUS	Magomed Ozdoyev (from (Russia) Lokomotiv Moscow, previously on loan)
40	DF	RUS	Danis Giniyatullin
42	DF	RUS	Amir Gavrilov
54	FW	RUS	Shakhrom Sulaymonov
64	FW	RUS	Nikita Tankov
65	DF	RUS	Maksim Zhestokov (end of loan at (Russia) Volga Nizhny Novgorod)
72	FW	RUS	Kamil Mullin (end of loan at (Russia) Sokol Saratov)
93	MF	RUS	Albert Sharipov (from (Russia) Tom Tomsk)
96	MF	RUS	German Frolov
97	FW	RUS	Dmitri Kamenshchikov
98	GK	RUS	Anton Chernov

Out: Note: Flags indicate national team as defined under FIFA eligibility rules; some limited exceptions apply. Players may hold more than one non-FIFA nationality.

No.	Pos.	Nation	Player
9	FW	RUS	Dmitri Otstavnov (on loan to (Russia) Volga Ulyanovsk)
10	FW	CRO	Marko Livaja (on loan to (Italy) Empoli)
16	MF	RUS	Ilsur Samigullin (on loan to (Kazakhstan) Zhetysu)
23	DF	GEO	Mamuka Kobakhidze (on loan to (Russia) Mordovia Saransk)
38	MF	FRA	Yann M'Vila (on loan to (England) Sunderland, previously on loan at (Italy) Internazionale Milano)
39	DF	COD	Chris Mavinga (on loan to (France) ESTAC, previously on loan at (France) Stade de Reims)
40	MF	RUS	Timur Ayupov
42	DF	RUS	Denis Kibardin (on loan to (Russia) Zenit-Izhevsk Izhevsk)
44	DF	ESP	César Navas (to (Russia) FC Rostov)
44	MF	GHA	Wakaso Mubarak (on loan to (Spain) Las Palmas, previously on loan at (Scotland) Celtic)
52	MF	RUS	Aleksei Kotlyarov
57	MF	RUS	Nikita Lobanov
58	FW	RUS	Andrei Vshivtsev (to (Russia) Dnepr Smolensk)
64	MF	RUS	Nikita Bocharov (to (Russia) Tom-2 Tomsk)
66	MF	RUS	Marat Sitdikov (to (Russia) Dnepr Smolensk)
68	GK	RUS	Yaroslav Maloletkov
72	FW	RUS	Kamil Mullin (on loan to (Russia) Sokol Saratov)
73	MF	RUS	Ranis Khusnutdinov
78	MF	RUS	Mikhail Petrolay (on loan to (Kazakhstan) Zhetysu)
79	MF	UZB	Bobir Davlatov (on loan to (Kazakhstan) Zhetysu)
90	FW	RUS	Ruslan Galiakberov (on loan to (Kazakhstan) Zhetysu)
92	MF	RUS	Pavel Shadrin (on loan to (Russia) Zenit-Izhevsk Izhevsk)
93	MF	RUS	Ildar Bikchantayev (to (Russia) Zenit Penza)
94	MF	RUS	Artyom Kuklev
95	MF	RUS	Almaz Askarov (to (Russia) Gazovik Orenburg)
98	DF	RUS	Almaz Nasybullin
—	FW	RUS	Sergei Davydov (on loan to (Russia) KAMAZ Naberezhnye Chelny, previously on loan at (Russia) Torpedo Moscow)
—	FW	RUS	Ruslan Mukhametshin (to (Russia) Mordovia Saransk, previously on loan)

=== Winter ===
In: Note: Flags indicate national team as defined under FIFA eligibility rules; some limited exceptions apply. Players may hold more than one non-FIFA nationality.

No.	Pos.	Nation	Player
13	DF	SWE	Emil Bergström (from (Sweden) Djurgården)
19	FW	RUS	Mikhail Yakovlev
20	MF	CRO	Mijo Caktaš (from (Croatia) Hajduk Split)
25	MF	UZB	Bobir Davlatov (end of loan to (Kazakhstan) Zhetysu)
28	MF	RUS	Mikhail Petrolay (end of loan to (Kazakhstan) Zhetysu)
31	MF	RUS	Denis Tkachuk (from (Russia) Zenit St. Petersburg)
35	DF	RUS	Kirill Lukyanchikov
36	MF	RUS	Maksim Bobrovskiy (from own academy)
47	DF	RUS	Dmitri Gubanov
48	MF	RUS	Artur Nikolayev
54	MF	RUS	Erik Vasilyev (from (Russia) Neftekhimik Nizhnekamsk)
57	DF	RUS	Iskander Badriyev
62	FW	RUS	Artur Kovalik
73	MF	RUS	Igor Nikolov
78	FW	RUS	Nikita Torgashov
79	DF	UKR	Andriy Pylyavskyi (from (Ukraine) Zorya Luhansk)
90	FW	RUS	Ilya Gilyazutdinov

Out: Note: Flags indicate national team as defined under FIFA eligibility rules; some limited exceptions apply. Players may hold more than one non-FIFA nationality.

No.	Pos.	Nation	Player
4	DF	URU	Mauricio Lemos (on loan to (Spain) Las Palmas, previously from (Uruguay) Defensor Sporting, previously on loan from Defensor)
9	FW	RUS	Ramil Sheydayev (end of loan from (Russia) Zenit St. Petersburg)
12	GK	RUS	Aleksandr Filtsov (on loan to (Russia) Arsenal Tula)
13	GK	IRI	Alireza Haghighi (to (Portugal) Marítimo)
24	MF	RUS	Ilsur Samigullin (on loan to (Russia) Neftekhimik Nizhnekamsk, previously on loan to (Kazakhstan) Zhetysu)
33	DF	RUS	Inal Getigezhev (on loan to (Russia) Gazovik Orenburg)
54	FW	RUS	Shakhrom Sulaymonov (released)
59	DF	RUS	Aydar Khabibullin (on loan to (Russia) Neftekhimik Nizhnekamsk)
89	GK	RUS	Anatoli Malashenko (on loan to (Russia) Neftekhimik Nizhnekamsk)
93	MF	RUS	Albert Sharipov (on loan to (Russia) Tom Tomsk)

== Competitions ==
=== Russian Premier League ===
==== Results by round ====
Round	1	2	3	4	5	6	7	8	9	10	11	12	13	14	15	16	17	18	19	20	21	22	23	24	25	26	27	28	29	30
Ground	A	H	A	H	A	H	A	H	A	H	A	H	A	A	H	A	H	A	H	A	H	A	H	A	H	A	H	H	A	H
Result	L	L	L	L	W	L	L	W	D	L	L	W	L	W	W	W	D	L	W	L	D	L	W	W	L	D	D	L	D	L
Position	12	16	16	16	13	14	15	13	12	12	13	12	12	12	10	9	9	9	9	9	9	10	9	9	9	9	10	10	10	10

Updated to match(es) played on 21 May 2016. Source: Russian Premier League
A = Away; H = Home; W = Win; D = Draw; L = Loss

==== Matches ====
18 July 2015 1	CSKA Moscow	1 – 0	Rubin Kazan	Khimki
19:30 MSK (UTC+3)	Wernbloom (yellow card) 36'; Nababkin (yellow card) 61'; Musa 87'	Report	Dyadyun (yellow card) 68'; Batov (yellow card) 73'	Stadium: Arena Khimki; Attendance: 10,000; Referee: V. Bezborodov

26 July 2015 2	Rubin Kazan	0 – 2	Amkar Perm	Kazan
18:00 MSK (UTC+3)	Nabiullin (yellow card) 14'; Kverkvelia (yellow card) 16' (yellow-red card) 64', 48' (o.g.); Kuzmin (yellow card) 42'	Report	Uzochukwu (yellow card) 25'; Jovičić (yellow card) 42'; Zanev (yellow card) 43'; Ogude (yellow card) 54'; Cherenchikov (yellow card) 54'; Gerus (yellow card) 90+2'; Peev 90+3'	Stadium: Central Stadium; Attendance: 6,178; Referee: S. Karasev

3 August 2015 3	Spartak Moscow	1 – 0	Rubin Kazan	Moscow
20:00 MSK (UTC+3)	Shirokov (yellow card) 40'; Bocchetti (yellow card) 49'; Movsisyan 60'	Report	Cotugno (yellow card) 40'; Georgiev (yellow card) 75'; Kuzmin (yellow card) 80' (yellow-red card) 86'	Stadium: Otkrytie Arena; Attendance: 26,163; Referee: S. Lapochkin

10 August 2015 4	Rubin Kazan	0 – 3	Rostov	Kazan
19:00 MSK (UTC+3)	Kambolov (yellow card) 59'; Ozdoev (yellow card) 82'; Georgiev (yellow card) 90+4'	Report	Bukharov 4', 73', (yellow card) 35'; Kanga 39'	Stadium: Central Stadium; Attendance: 5,842; Referee: A. Nikolaev

15 August 2015 5	Kuban Krasnodar	0 – 1	Rubin Kazan	Krasnodar
22:30 MSK (UTC+3)	Arshavin (yellow card) 66'; Rabiu (yellow card) 90+4'	Report	Karadeniz 33'; Nabiullin (yellow card) 88'; Kanunnikov (yellow card) 89'	Stadium: Kuban Stadium; Attendance: 6,729; Referee: S. Kostevich

24 August 2015 6	Rubin Kazan	1 – 3	Zenit St. Petersburg	Kazan
20:00 MSK (UTC+3)	Ozdoev (yellow card) 53'; Kanunnikov (yellow card) 63'; Bilyaletdinov 72'; Kuzmin (yellow card) 81'	Report	Shatov 16', 84'; García (yellow card) 60'; Hulk 78'	Stadium: Central Stadium; Attendance: 11,012; Referee: M. Vilkov

30 August 2015 7	Mordovia Saransk	2 – 1	Rubin Kazan	Samara
18:00 MSK (UTC+3)	Stevanović 37' (pen.); Nakhushev (yellow card) 43'; Mukhametshin 49', (yellow card) 84'	Report	Dyadyun (yellow card) 23'; Ryzhikov (red card) 33'; Portnyagin 61'; Ozdoev (yellow card) 77'; Kuzmin (yellow card) 90+2'; Bilyaletdinov (yellow card) 90+2'	Stadium: Metallurg Stadium; Attendance: 1,107; Referee: S. Karasev

12 September 2015 8	Rubin Kazan	3 – 1	Lokomotiv Moscow	Kazan
20:00 MSK (UTC+3)	Carlos Eduardo 9'; Kanunnikov 25'; Bilyaletdinov 70', (yellow card) 79'; Nabiullin (yellow card) 88'; Kuzmin (yellow card) 89'	Report	Niasse (yellow card) 12'; Denisov (yellow card) 36'; Samedov 58'; Maicon (yellow card) 64'; Logashov (yellow card) 73'; Pejčinović (yellow card) 79'; Tarasov (yellow card) 90+3'	Stadium: Central Stadium; Attendance: 17,987; Referee: S. Kulikov

21 September 2015 9	Dynamo Moscow	0 – 0	Rubin Kazan	Khimki
20:00 MSK (UTC+3)	Kokorin (yellow card) 28'	Report	Kverkvelia (yellow card) 23'; Kislyak (yellow card) 44'	Stadium: Arena Khimki; Attendance: 5,272; Referee: V. Moskalev

27 September 2015 10	Rubin Kazan	1 – 2	Ural	Kazan
20:00 MSK (UTC+3)	Nabiullin 24'; Kanunnikov (yellow card) 77'; Kverkvelia 79' (o.g.)	Report	Podberyozkin 3'; Kulakov (yellow card) 33'; Sapeta (yellow card) 45'; Martynovich (yellow card) 52'; Stavpets (yellow card) 83'; Yerokhin (yellow card) 85'	Stadium: Central Stadium; Attendance: 16,807; Referee: A. Egorov

4 October 2015 11	Terek Grozny	2 – 1	Rubin Kazan	Grozny
17:00 MSK (UTC+3)	Sadayev 18', 23', (yellow card) 36'; Semenov (yellow card) 39'; Kuzyayev (yellow card) 78'; Maurício (yellow card) 88'	Report	Kuzmin (yellow card) 14'; Ozdoev 51'; Carlos Eduardo (yellow card) 81'	Stadium: Akhmat-Arena; Attendance: 14,245; Referee: V. Meshkov

17 October 2015 12	Rubin Kazan	3 – 1	Ufa	Kazan
20:00 MSK (UTC+3)	Kuzmin 20', 78'; Kislyak 65'	Report	Pourié 4'; Handžić (yellow card) 76'	Stadium: Central Stadium; Attendance: 10,043; Referee: V. Bezborodov

25 October 2015 13	Krasnodar	2 – 1	Rubin Kazan	Krasnodar
17:30 MSK (UTC+3)	Ari 16', 24'; Mamayev (yellow card) 49'; Kaleshin (yellow card) 66'; Laborde (yellow card) 78' (yellow-red card) 90+5'	Report	Kanunnikov 21'; Portnyagin (yellow card) 72'	Stadium: Kuban Stadium; Attendance: 5,350; Referee: I. Fedotov

1 November 2015 14	Anzhi Makhachkala	1 – 2	Rubin Kazan	Kaspiysk
15:30 MSK (UTC+3)	Maksimov 65'; Ebecilio (yellow card) 66'	Report	Dević 20', 22'	Stadium: Anzhi Arena; Attendance: 4,530; Referee: A. Nikolaev

8 November 2015 15	Rubin Kazan	2 – 0	Krylia Sovetov	Kazan
13:30 MSK (UTC+3)	Karadeniz 38', 90+1'	Report	Taranov (yellow card) 28'; Yatchenko (yellow card) 60'	Stadium: Central Stadium; Attendance: 6,233; Referee: V. Meshkov

21 November 2015 16	Amkar Perm	1 – 2	Rubin Kazan	Perm
11:00 MSK (UTC+3)	Ogude (yellow card) 14'; Zanev (yellow card) 31'; Selikhov (yellow card) 45+2'; Shavayev 54'; Cherenchikov (yellow card) 63'	Report	Dević 37' (pen.), 62'; Kuzmin (yellow card) 56'; Georgiev (yellow card) 61'	Stadium: Zvezda Stadium; Attendance: 2,350; Referee: V. Bezborodov

30 November 2015 17	Rubin Kazan	2 – 2	Spartak Moscow	Kazan
18:15 MSK (UTC+3)	Dević 70', (yellow card) 71'; Ustinov (yellow card) 73'; Nabiullin (yellow card) 77'; Kverkvelia 90+4', (yellow card) 90+4'	Report	Zé Luís 51'; Promes 74' (pen.)	Stadium: Central Stadium; Attendance: 20,255; Referee: S. Kulikov

4 December 2015 18	Rostov	1 – 0	Rubin Kazan	Rostov-on-Don
18:00 MSK (UTC+3)	Rotenberg (yellow card) 34'; Kalachou (yellow card) 42'; Dzhanayev (yellow card) 42'; Noboa (yellow card) 85'	Report	Kambolov (yellow card) 30'; Kislyak (yellow card) 36'; Ryzhikov 37' (o.g.); Georgiev (red card) 42'	Stadium: Olimp-2; Attendance: 10,457; Referee: A. Nikolaev

5 March 2016 19	Rubin Kazan	1 – 0	Kuban Krasnodar	Kazan
17:00 MSK (UTC+3)	Kuzmin (yellow card) 47'; Tkachuk 62'	Report	Rabiu (yellow card) 10'; Xandão (yellow card) 45'	Stadium: Kazan Arena; Attendance: 16,127; Referee: M. Vilkov

13 March 2016 20	Zenit St. Petersburg	4 – 2	Rubin Kazan	Saint Petersburg
20:30 MSK (UTC+3)	Danny 5', 65'; Zhirkov (yellow card) 25'; Neto (yellow card) 40'; Dzyuba 42'; Hulk 48'; Yusupov (yellow card) 90+3'	Report	Kambolov (yellow card) 58'; Dević 64'; Portnyagin 68'	Stadium: Petrovsky Stadium; Attendance: 16,797; Referee: V. Moskalev

20 March 2016 21	Rubin Kazan	1 – 1	Mordovia Saransk	Kazan
18:00 MSK (UTC+3)	Karadeniz 65'; Kuzmin (yellow card) 84'	Report	Mukhametshin 18', (yellow card) 73'; Shitov (yellow card) 44'	Stadium: Kazan Arena; Attendance: 11,269; Referee: A. Matyunin

3 April 2016 22	Lokomotiv Moscow	1 – 0	Rubin Kazan	Moscow
17:00 MSK (UTC+3)	Mykhalyk (yellow card) 42'; Škuletić 83'	Report	Kambolov (yellow card) 37'; Ustinov (yellow card) 52'; Ryzhikov (yellow card) 78'	Stadium: Lokomotiv Stadium; Attendance: 8,103; Referee: V. Meshkov

9 April 2016 23	Rubin Kazan	4 – 1	Dynamo Moscow	Kazan
19:30 MSK (UTC+3)	Karadeniz 3'; Kanunnikov 14'; Portnyagin 30'; Dević 67' (pen.)	Report	Ionov 17' (pen.)	Stadium: Central Stadium; Attendance: 12,073; Referee: K. Levnikov

18 April 2016 24	Ural	0 – 1	Rubin Kazan	Yekaterinburg
17:00 MSK (UTC+3)		Report	Bergström 75'; Tkachuk (yellow card) 90+2'	Stadium: SKB-Bank Arena; Attendance: 4,540; Referee: A. Yeskov

23 April 2016 25	Rubin Kazan	0 – 1	Terek Grozny	Kazan
19:30 MSK (UTC+3)		Report	Pliyev (yellow card) 15'; Rybus 19'; Adilson (yellow card) 82'; Kuzyayev (yellow card) 74'	Stadium: Central Stadium; Attendance: 9,167; Referee: A. Matyunin

1 May 2016 26	Ufa	1 – 1	Rubin Kazan	Ufa
12:00 MSK (UTC+3)	Sysuyev 21'; Igboun (yellow card) 53'; Stotsky (yellow card) 81'	Report	Ozdoyev 43'; Kambolov (yellow card) 50' (yellow-red card) 63'; Caktaš (yellow card) 86'	Stadium: Neftyanik Stadium; Attendance: 8,150; Referee: S. Karasev

7 May 2016 27	Rubin Kazan	1 – 1	Krasnodar	Kazan
19:30 MSK (UTC+3)	Kanunnikov 29'	Report	Kabore (yellow card) 46'; Smolov 55'; Petrov (yellow card) 57'	Stadium: Central Stadium; Attendance: 6,877; Referee: A. Nikolaev

11 May 2016 28	Rubin Kazan	1 – 2	Anzhi Makhachkala	Kazan
19:00 MSK (UTC+3)	Portnyagin 17'; Kuzmin (yellow card) 48' (yellow-red card) 89'; Bergström (yellow card) 52'; Kislyak (yellow card) 54'	Report	Boli 33'; Lazić 58'; Mayewski (yellow card) 65'	Stadium: Central Stadium; Attendance: 7,838; Referee: V. Bezborodov

15 May 2016 29	Krylia Sovetov	1 – 1	Rubin Kazan	Samara
14:30 MSK (UTC+3)	Bruno 52'	Report	Kambolov (yellow card) 19'; Caktaš 89' (pen.)	Stadium: Metallurg Stadium; Attendance: 6,733; Referee: V. Seldyakov

20 May 2016 30	Rubin Kazan	0 – 1	CSKA Moscow	Kazan
MSK (UTC+3)	Karadeniz (yellow card) 18'; Cotugno (yellow card) 42'	Report	Dzagoev 19'; Tošić (yellow card) 43'; Ignashevich (yellow card) 75'; Wernbloom (yellow card) 90+2'	Stadium: Central Stadium; Attendance: 20,352; Referee: S. Lapochkin

==== League table ====
Pos	Team	Pld	W	D	L	GF	GA	GD	Pts
8	Ural Sverdlovsk Oblast	30	10	9	11	39	46	−7	39
9	Krylia Sovetov Samara	30	9	8	13	19	31	−12	35
10	Rubin Kazan	30	9	6	15	33	39	−6	33
11	Amkar Perm	30	7	10	13	22	33	−11	31
12	Ufa	30	6	9	15	25	44	−19	27

Source: Russian Premier League, Soccerway
Rules for classification: 1) Points; 2) Matches won; 3) Head-to-head points; 4) Head-to-head matches won; 5) Head-to-head goal difference; 6) Head-to-head goals scored; 7) Head-to-head away goals; 8) Goal difference; 9) Goals scored; 10) Away goals scored.

=== Russian Cup ===
24 September 2015 Round of 32	SKA-Energiya Khabarovsk	2 – 0	Rubin Kazan	Khabarovsk
13:00 MSK (UTC+3)	Popov 3', (yellow card) 53'; Udaly (yellow card) 28'; Kupchin (yellow card) 61'; Karmazinenko (yellow card) 88'; Bazelyuk 90+2'	Report	Mironov (yellow card) 34'	Stadium: Lenin Stadium; Attendance: 5,800; Referee: S. Vasilyev

=== Europa league ===
==== Third qualifying round ====
30 July 2015 1	Sturm Graz (Austria)	2 – 3	(Russia) Rubin Kazan	Graz
20:00 MSK (UTC+3)	Avdijaj 21', (yellow card) 39' (yellow-red card) 69'; Ehrenreich (yellow card) 24'; Piesinger 56'	Report	Kanunnikov 14', (yellow card) 41'; Kambolov (yellow card) 23'; Karadeniz 25' (pen.); Portnyagin 61'; Georgiev (yellow card) 84'; Cotugno (yellow card) 90+1'	Stadium: UPC-Arena; Attendance: 9,765; Referee: Daniel Stefański (Poland)

6 August 2015 2	Rubin Kazan (Russia)	1 – 1 (4 – 3 agg.)	(Austria) Sturm Graz	Kazan
19:00 MSK (UTC+3)	Kambolov (yellow card) 67'; Kuzmin 85'	Report	Tadić 68'; Offenbacher (yellow card) 81'	Stadium: Central Stadium; Attendance: 9,346; Referee: Liran Liany (Israel)

==== Play-off round ====
20 August 2015 1	Rabotnički (North Macedonia)	1 – 1	(Russia) Rubin Kazan	Skopje
20:00 MSK (UTC+3)	Petrovikj (yellow card) 22' (yellow-red card) 54'; Anene (yellow card) 38'; Ristevski 85'	Report	Kambolov (yellow card) 31'; Kuzmin (yellow card) 50'; Karadeniz 68'; Batov (yellow card) 76'; Kislyak (yellow card) 90+1'	Stadium: Philip II Arena; Attendance: 10,000; Referee: István Vad (Hungary)

27 August 2015 2	Rubin Kazan (Russia)	1 – 0 (2 – 1 agg.)	(North Macedonia) Rabotnički	Kazan
19:00 MSK (UTC+3)	Carlos Eduardo 35'; Kanunnikov (yellow card) 51'; Kuzmin (yellow card) 85'; Georgiev (yellow card) 90'	Report	Ristevski (yellow card) 26'; Trajchevski (yellow card) 60'; Ilijoski (yellow card) 90+1'; Altiparmakovski (yellow card) 90+1'	Stadium: Central Stadium; Attendance: 4,231; Referee: Hüseyin Göçek (Turkey)

==== Group stage ====
Pos	Team	Pld	W	D	L	GF	GA	GD	Pts	Qualification	LIV	SIO	RUB	BOR
1	(England) Liverpool	6	2	4	0	6	4	+2	10	Advance to knockout phase	—	1–1	1–1	2–1
2	(Switzerland) Sion	6	2	3	1	5	5	0	9	Advance to knockout phase	0–0	—	2–1	1–1
3	(Russia) Rubin Kazan	6	1	3	2	6	6	0	6		0–1	2–0	—	0–0
4	(France) Bordeaux	6	0	4	2	5	7	−2	4		1–1	0–1	2–2	—

Source: Soccerway

17 September 2015 1	Sion (Switzerland)	2 – 1	(Russia) Rubin Kazan	Sion
21:00 MSK (UTC+3)	Konaté 11', 82'; Salatić (yellow card) 16'; Jagne (yellow card) 60'; Kouassi (yellow card) 80'	Report	Kuzmin (yellow card) 31'; Kanunnikov 65'; Georgiev (yellow card) 77'	Stadium: Stade Tourbillon; Attendance: 7,000; Referee: Andreas Ekberg (Sweden)

1 October 2015 2	Rubin Kazan (Russia)	0 – 0	(France) Bordeaux	Kazan
23:05 MSK (UTC+3)	Portnyagin (yellow card) 46'; Kislyak (yellow card) 75' (yellow-red card) 80'	Report	Crivelli (yellow card) 56'; Contento (yellow card) 61'	Stadium: Central Stadium; Attendance: 17,642; Referee: Gediminas Mažeika (Lithuania)

22 October 2015 3	Liverpool (England)	1 – 1	(Russia) Rubin Kazan	Liverpool
23:05 MSK (UTC+3)	Škrtel (yellow card) 35'; Can 37'; Allen (yellow card) 41'	Report	Dević 15'; Kuzmin (yellow card) 19' (yellow-red card) 36'	Stadium: Anfield; Attendance: 42,951; Referee: Robert Schörgenhofer (Austria)

5 November 2015 4	Rubin Kazan (Russia)	0 – 1	(England) Liverpool	Kazan
21:00 MSK (UTC+3)		Report	Ibe 52'; Lovren (yellow card) 76'	Stadium: Kazan Arena; Attendance: 41,585; Referee: Kevin Blom (Netherlands)

26 November 2015 5	Rubin Kazan (Russia)	2 – 0	(Switzerland) Sion	Kazan
19:00 MSK (UTC+3)	Ustinov (yellow card) 48'; Georgiev 72'; Dević 90'	Report	Ndoye (yellow card) 13' (yellow-red card) 34'; Rüfli (yellow card) 16'; Salatić (yellow card) 78'	Stadium: Kazan Arena; Attendance: 15,116; Referee: Halis Özkahya (Turkey)

10 December 2015 6	Bordeaux (France)	2 – 2	(Russia) Rubin Kazan	Bordeaux
21:00 MSK (UTC+3)	Guilbert (yellow card) 30' (yellow-red card) 86'; Laborde 58'; Yambéré (yellow card) 61'; Rolán 63'	Report	Kanunnikov 31'; Kuzmin (yellow card) 39'; Nabiullin (yellow card) 39'; Ustinov 76'	Stadium: Nouveau Stade de Bordeaux; Attendance: 13,640; Referee: John Beaton (Scotland)

== Squad statistics ==
As of match played 21 May 2016

=== Appearances and goals ===
No.	Pos	Nat	Player	Total		Premier League		Russian Cup		Europa League	
No.	Pos	Nat	Player	Apps	Goals	Apps	Goals	Apps	Goals	Apps	Goals
1	GK	(Russia) RUS	Sergey Ryzhikov	40	0	30	0	0	0	10	0
2	DF	(Russia) RUS	Oleg Kuzmin	19	3	11	2	0	0	8	1
3	DF	(Russia) RUS	Elmir Nabiullin	24	1	15+1	1	0	0	8	0
5	DF	(Georgia (country)) GEO	Solomon Kverkvelia	39	1	29	1	0	0	10	0
7	FW	(Russia) RUS	Igor Portnyagin	31	5	15+9	4	0	0	3+4	1
8	MF	(Russia) RUS	Maksim Batov	7	0	2+1	0	1	0	0+3	0
11	FW	(Ukraine) UKR	Marko Dević	24	9	11+7	7	0	0	5+1	2
13	DF	(Sweden) SWE	Emil Bergström	12	1	12	1	0	0	0	0
14	MF	(Russia) RUS	Diniyar Bilyaletdinov	21	2	8+6	2	0	0	4+3	0
15	MF	(Belarus) BLR	Syarhey Kislyak	23	1	14+3	1	0	0	4+2	0
20	MF	(Croatia) CRO	Mijo Caktaš	11	1	8+3	1	0	0	0	0
21	DF	(Uruguay) URU	Guillermo Cotugno	29	0	20+3	0	0	0	4+2	0
22	FW	(Russia) RUS	Vladimir Dyadyun	21	0	3+11	0	0	0	2+5	0
27	MF	(Russia) RUS	Magomed Ozdoev	39	2	28+1	2	0	0	8+2	0
29	MF	(Russia) RUS	Shota Bibilov	1	0	0	0	1	0	0	0
31	MF	(Russia) RUS	Denis Tkachuk	10	1	7+3	1	0	0	0	0
49	DF	(Russia) RUS	Vitali Ustinov	11	1	4+4	0	0	0	1+2	1
56	FW	(Russia) RUS	Gevorg Arutyunyan	1	0	0	0	0+1	0	0	0
61	MF	(Turkey) TUR	Gökdeniz Karadeniz	28	7	17+5	5	0	0	6	2
63	MF	(Russia) RUS	Alisher Dzhalilov	4	0	1+2	0	1	0	0	0
65	DF	(Russia) RUS	Maksim Zhestokov	1	0	0	0	1	0	0	0
77	MF	(Bulgaria) BUL	Blagoy Georgiev	24	1	14+1	0	0	0	8+1	1
79	DF	(Ukraine) UKR	Andriy Pylyavskyi	3	0	2+1	0	0	0	0	0
80	DF	(Russia) RUS	Yegor Sorokin	1	0	0	0	1	0	0	0
83	MF	(Russia) RUS	Aleksandr Kuznetsov	1	0	0	0	1	0	0	0
84	MF	(Russia) RUS	Andrei Mironov	1	0	0	0	1	0	0	0
85	MF	(Russia) RUS	Ilzat Akhmetov	6	0	0+3	0	0+1	0	0+2	0
88	DF	(Russia) RUS	Ruslan Kambolov	36	0	24+3	0	0	0	9	0
91	GK	(Russia) RUS	Yuri Nesterenko	1	0	0+1	0	0	0	0	0
97	FW	(Russia) RUS	Dmitri Kamenshchikov	1	0	0	0	0+1	0	0	0
99	FW	(Russia) RUS	Maksim Kanunnikov	40	7	30	4	0	0	9+1	3
Players away from the club on loan:
4	DF	(Uruguay) URU	Mauricio Lemos	7	0	4	0	1	0	2	0
33	DF	(Russia) RUS	Inal Getigezhev	1	0	0	0	1	0	0	0
93	MF	(Russia) RUS	Albert Sharipov	1	0	0+1	0	0	0	0	0
Players who appeared for Rubin Kazan but left during the season:
9	FW	(Russia) RUS	Ramil Sheydayev	2	0	1	0	1	0	0	0
10	MF	(Brazil) BRA	Carlos Eduardo	25	2	10+6	1	0	0	9	1
13	GK	(Iran) IRI	Alireza Haghighi	1	0	0	0	1	0	0	0

=== Goal Scorers ===
Place	Position	Nation	Number	Name	Russian Premier League	Russian Cup	Europa League	Total
1	FW	(Ukraine)	11	Marko Dević	7	0	2	9
2	MF	(Turkey)	61	Gökdeniz Karadeniz	5	0	2	7
2	FW	(Russia)	99	Maksim Kanunnikov	4	0	3	7
4	FW	(Russia)	7	Igor Portnyagin	4	0	1	5
5	DF	(Russia)	2	Oleg Kuzmin	2	0	1	3
6	MF	(Russia)	14	Diniyar Bilyaletdinov	2	0	0	2
6	MF	(Russia)	27	Magomed Ozdoev	2	0	0	2
6	MF	(Brazil)	10	Carlos Eduardo	1	0	1	2
9	DF	(Russia)	3	Elmir Nabiullin	1	0	0	1
9	DF	(Georgia (country))	5	Solomon Kverkvelia	1	0	0	1
9	DF	(Sweden)	13	Emil Bergström	1	0	0	1
9	MF	(Belarus)	15	Syarhey Kislyak	1	0	0	1
9	MF	(Croatia)	20	Mijo Caktaš	1	0	0	1
9	MF	(Russia)	31	Denis Tkachuk	1	0	0	1
9	DF	(Russia)	49	Vitali Ustinov	0	0	1	1
9	MF	(Bulgaria)	77	Blagoy Georgiev	0	0	1	1
				TOTALS	33	0	12	45

=== Disciplinary record ===
Number	Nation	Position	Name	Russian Premier League		Russian Cup		Europa League		Total	
Number	Nation	Position	Name	Yellow card	Red card	Yellow card	Red card	Yellow card	Red card	Yellow card	Red card
1	(Russia)	GK	Sergey Ryzhikov	1	1	0	0	0	0	1	1
2	(Russia)	DF	Oleg Kuzmin	10	2	0	0	5	1	15	3
3	(Russia)	DF	Elmir Nabiullin	4	0	0	0	1	0	5	0
5	(Georgia (country))	DF	Solomon Kverkvelia	3	1	0	0	0	0	3	1
7	(Russia)	FW	Igor Portnyagin	1	0	0	0	1	0	2	0
8	(Russia)	MF	Maksim Batov	1	0	0	0	1	0	2	0
10	(Brazil)	MF	Carlos Eduardo	1	0	0	0	0	0	1	0
11	(Ukraine)	FW	Marko Dević	1	0	0	0	0	0	1	0
13	(Sweden)	DF	Emil Bergström	1	0	0	0	0	0	1	0
14	(Russia)	MF	Diniyar Bilyaletdinov	2	0	0	0	0	0	2	0
15	(Belarus)	MF	Syarhey Kislyak	3	0	0	0	2	1	5	1
20	(Croatia)	MF	Mijo Caktaš	1	0	0	0	0	0	1	0
21	(Uruguay)	DF	Guillermo Cotugno	2	0	0	0	1	0	3	0
22	(Russia)	FW	Vladimir Dyadyun	2	0	0	0	0	0	2	0
27	(Russia)	MF	Magomed Ozdoev	3	0	0	0	0	0	3	0
31	(Russia)	MF	Denis Tkachuk	1	0	0	0	0	0	1	0
49	(Russia)	DF	Vitali Ustinov	2	0	0	0	1	0	3	0
61	(Turkey)	MF	Gökdeniz Karadeniz	1	0	0	0	0	0	1	0
77	(Bulgaria)	MF	Blagoy Georgiev	3	1	0	0	3	0	6	1
84	(Russia)	MF	Andrei Mironov	0	0	1	0	0	0	1	0
88	(Russia)	DF	Ruslan Kambolov	6	1	0	0	3	0	9	1
99	(Russia)	FW	Maksim Kanunnikov	3	0	0	0	2	0	5	0
			TOTALS	52	6	1	0	20	2	73	8
