= 2013–14 FC Rubin Kazan season =

Rubin
2013–14 season
- Chairman: Alexander Gusev
- Manager: Kurban Berdyev till 20 December 2013; Vladimir Maminov from 10 January 2014
- Stadium: Tsentralnyi Stadion, Kazan
- Russian Premier League: 9th
- Russian Cup: Fifth Round vs Luch-Energiya Vladivostok
- Europa League: Round of 32 vs Real Betis
- Top goalscorer: League: Salomón Rondón (6); All: Salomón Rondón (12)
- Highest home attendance: 20,087 vs CSKA Moscow; 3 August 2013
- Lowest home attendance: 2,754 vs Maribor; 28 November 2013
- Average home league attendance: 6,537
Home colours	Away colours

The 2013–14 Rubin season was the 10th successive season that the club played in the Russian Premier League, the highest tier of association football in Russia. Kazan played in the Russian Cup, reaching the Fifth Round, the Europa League, reaching the Round of 32 and the Russian Premier League.

In December 2013, manager Kurban Berdyev was fired after 13 years with the club, being replaced by Vladimir Maminov the following month.

== Squad ==
Note: Flags indicate national team as defined under FIFA eligibility rules; some limited exceptions apply. Players may hold more than one non-FIFA nationality.

No.	Pos.	Nation	Player
1	GK	RUS	Sergei Ryzhikov
2	DF	RUS	Oleg Kuzmin
3	DF	RUS	Elmir Nabiullin
4	DF	RUS	Taras Burlak
5	DF	GEO	Solomon Kvirkvelia
6	MF	RUS	Alan Kasaev
7	MF	RUS	Vladislav Kulik
8	MF	RUS	Pavel Mogilevets (on loan from Zenit Saint Petersburg)
9	FW	RUS	Aleksandr Prudnikov
10	MF	RUS	Dmitri Torbinski
11	FW	UKR	Marko Dević
14	MF	TUR	Gökhan Töre
15	MF	BLR	Syarhey Kislyak
16	FW	RUS	Georgi Nurov
18	FW	LAT	Artūrs Karašausks (on loan from Skonto Rīga)
19	FW	RUS	Kamil Mullin
20	MF	UZB	Vagiz Galiulin
21	MF	GHA	Wakaso

No.	Pos.	Nation	Player
22	DF	FRA	Chris Mavinga
23	MF	FIN	Roman Eremenko
24	GK	LTU	Giedrius Arlauskis
25	DF	ESP	Iván Marcano
33	DF	RUS	Inal Getigezhev
44	DF	ESP	César Navas
61	MF	TUR	Gökdeniz Karadeniz
63	MF	RUS	Alisher Dzhalilov
69	FW	IRI	Sardar Azmoun
76	DF	RUS	Roman Sharonov
81	FW	RUS	Ruslan Mukhametshin
87	MF	BRA	Carlos Eduardo
88	MF	RUS	Ruslan Kambolov
90	MF	FRA	Yann M'Vila
91	GK	RUS	Yuri Nesterenko
92	DF	AZE	Ruslan Abishov
94	DF	RUS	Maksim Zhestokov

=== Out on loan ===
Note: Flags indicate national team as defined under FIFA eligibility rules; some limited exceptions apply. Players may hold more than one non-FIFA nationality.

No.	Pos.	Nation	Player
25	DF	ESP	Iván Marcano (at Olympiacos until 30 June 2014)
63	MF	RUS	Alisher Dzhalilov (at Neftekhimik Nizhnekamsk until 31 May 2014)
—	GK	IRI	Alireza Haghighi (at Sporting Covilhã until 30 June 2014)
—	DF	RUS	Ivan Temnikov (at Terek Grozny until 30 June 2014)

No.	Pos.	Nation	Player
—	MF	BRA	Carlos Eduardo (at Flamengo until 30 June 2014)
—	MF	RUS	Alan Kasaev (at Dynamo Moscow until 30 June 2014)
—	MF	TUR	Gökhan Töre (at Beşiktaş until 30 June 2014)
—	FW	RUS	Sergei Davydov (at Aktobe until 30 June 2014)

=== Reserves ===
Note: Flags indicate national team as defined under FIFA eligibility rules; some limited exceptions apply. Players may hold more than one non-FIFA nationality.

No.	Pos.	Nation	Player
30	MF	RUS	Igor Rogachevskiy
32	MF	RUS	Anatoli Savelyev
35	DF	RUS	Ayrat Mukhtarov
38	FW	RUS	German Sergeyev
39	DF	RUS	Yuri Litke
41	FW	RUS	Selim Nurmuradov
42	DF	RUS	Dimitri Boykov
45	GK	RUS	Timur Akmurzin
46	MF	RUS	Nozim Babadzhanov
47	DF	BLR	Mikhail Babichev
51	MF	RUS	Aslanbek Sikoyev
54	FW	RUS	Vladislav Shpitalniy
56	FW	RUS	Gevorg Arutyunyan
57	MF	RUS	Nikita Lobanov

No.	Pos.	Nation	Player
59	DF	RUS	Aydar Khabibullin
68	GK	RUS	Yaroslav Maloletkov
70	GK	RUS	Yevgeni Shchetinin
71	MF	RUS	Aleksei Pashchenko
72	FW	GEO	Nika Kacharava
73	DF	RUS	Nikolai Zlobin
75	MF	RUS	Boris Shavlokhov
78	MF	RUS	Mikhail Petrolay
80	DF	RUS	Yegor Sorokin
82	DF	RUS	Nikita Mikhailov
83	DF	RUS	Aleksandr Kuznetsov
84	MF	RUS	Andrei Mironov
85	MF	RUS	Ilzat Akhmetov
98	MF	RUS	Roman Stepin

== Transfers ==
=== Summer ===
In: Note: Flags indicate national team as defined under FIFA eligibility rules; some limited exceptions apply. Players may hold more than one non-FIFA nationality.

No.	Pos.	Nation	Player
7	MF	RUS	Vladislav Kulik (from (Russia) Kuban Krasnodar)
9	FW	RUS	Aleksandr Prudnikov (from (Russia) Alania Vladikavkaz)
10	MF	RUS	Dmitri Torbinski (from (Russia) Lokomotiv Moscow)
21	MF	GHA	Wakaso (from (Spain) Espanyol)
22	DF	FRA	Chris Mavinga (from (France) Rennes)
33	DF	RUS	Inal Getigezhev (from (Russia) Rostov)
52	DF	RUS	Konstantin Vasilyev (end of loan to (Russia) Rubin-2 Kazan)
63	MF	RUS	Alisher Dzhalilov (end of loan to (Russia) Neftekhimik Nizhnekamsk)
81	FW	RUS	Ruslan Mukhametshin (from (Russia) Mordovia)
—	DF	RUS	Iskandar Dzhalilov (end of loan to (Romania) Turnu Severin)

Out: Note: Flags indicate national team as defined under FIFA eligibility rules; some limited exceptions apply. Players may hold more than one non-FIFA nationality.

No.	Pos.	Nation	Player
3	DF	ARG	Cristian Ansaldi (to (Russia) Zenit St. Petersburg)
6	MF	ESP	Pablo Orbaiz (retired)
10	MF	RUS	Alan Kasaev (on loan to (Russia) Dynamo Moscow)
19	DF	RUS	Vitali Kaleshin (to (Russia) FC Krasnodar)
20	MF	FIN	Alexei Eremenko (to (Kazakhstan) Kairat)
22	FW	RUS	Vladimir Dyadyun (to (Russia) Dynamo Moscow)
35	DF	RUS	Ivan Temnikov (on loan to (Russia) Terek Grozny)
55	MF	TUR	Gökhan Töre (on loan to (Turkey) Beşiktaş)
70	DF	RUS	Yevgeni Kozlov (end of loan from (Russia) Vityaz Podolsk)
71	DF	RUS	Aleksei Pashchenko (to (Russia) Rubin-2 Kazan)
88	GK	IRI	Alireza Haghighi (on loan to (Iran) Persepolis)
—	DF	RUS	Viktor Garayev (to (Russia) Rubin-2 Kazan, previously on loan)
—	DF	RUS	Aleksandr Kulikov (to (Russia) Luch-Energiya Vladivostok, previously on loan to (Russia) Neftekhimik Nizhnekamsk)
—	DF	RUS	Maksim Zhestokov (to (Russia) Neftekhimik Nizhnekamsk, previously on loan to (Russia) Volgar Astrakhan)
—	MF	RUS	Nikita Khromykh (to (Russia) Rubin-2 Kazan, previously on loan)
—	FW	MDA	Alexandru Antoniuc (on loan to (Moldova) Veris, previously on loan to (Moldova) Zimbru Chișinău)
—	FW	RUS	Sergei Davydov (on loan to (Kazakhstan) Aktobe, previously on loan to (Russia) Dynamo Moscow)
—	FW	UZB	Ayubkhon Gapparov (to (Uzbekistan) Navbahor Namangan, previously on loan to (Russia) Neftekhimik Nizhnekamsk)
—	FW	RUS	Igor Portnyagin (on loan to (Russia) Tom Tomsk, previously on loan to (Russia) Krylia Sovetov Samara)

=== Winter ===
In: Note: Flags indicate national team as defined under FIFA eligibility rules; some limited exceptions apply. Players may hold more than one non-FIFA nationality.

No.	Pos.	Nation	Player
4	DF	RUS	Taras Burlak (from (Russia) Lokomotiv Moscow)
8	MF	RUS	Pavel Mogilevets (loan from (Russia) Zenit St. Petersburg)
11	FW	UKR	Marko Dević (from (Ukraine) Metalist Kharkiv)
18	FW	LAT	Artūrs Karašausks (loan from (Latvia) Skonto Riga)
19	FW	RUS	Kamil Mullin (from (Russia) Lokomotiv Moscow)
88	DF	RUS	Ruslan Kambolov (from (Russia) Neftekhimik Nizhnekamsk)

Out: Note: Flags indicate national team as defined under FIFA eligibility rules; some limited exceptions apply. Players may hold more than one non-FIFA nationality.

No.	Pos.	Nation	Player
8	MF	RUS	Aleksandr Ryazantsev (to (Russia) Zenit St. Petersburg)
25	DF	ESP	Iván Marcano (loan to (Greece) Olympiacos)
63	MF	RUS	Alisher Dzhalilov (loan to (Russia) Neftekhimik Nizhnekamsk)
66	MF	ISR	Bibras Natcho (to (Greece) PAOK)
99	FW	VEN	Salomón Rondón (to (Russia) Zenit St. Petersburg)

== Competitions ==
=== Russian Premier League ===
==== Results by round ====
Round	1	2	3	4	5	6	7	8	9	10	11	12	13	14	15	16	17	18	19	20	21	22	23	24	25	26	27	28	29	30
Ground	A	H	A	H	A	H	A	A	H	H	A	H	A	H	A	H	A	H	A	A	H	A	H	A	H	H	A	H	A	H
Result	D	W	D	D	D	D	W	D	L	D	L	W	L	L	D	L	W	W	D	L	W	D	L	L	L	W	L	W	W	D
Position	12	8	5	8	7	9	6	7	9	9	9	8	8	10	9	10	10	9	8	11	9	9	9	10	10	10	10	10	9	9

Updated to match(es) played on 16 May 2013. Source: Russian Premier League
A = Away; H = Home; W = Win; D = Draw; L = Loss

==== League table ====
Pos	Team	Pld	W	D	L	GF	GA	GD	Pts	Qualification or relegation
7	Rostov	30	10	9	11	40	40	0	39	Qualification for the Europa League play-off round (Note: Rostov won the 2013–14 Russian Cup, therefore qualifying for the play-off round of the 2014–15 UEFA Europa League. However, it did not pass the Russian Football Union European licensing and thus its spot was given to Spartak. However, that RFU decision was then overturned by the CAS and Rostov was returned to the Europa League.)
8	Kuban Krasnodar	30	10	8	12	40	42	−2	38	
9	Rubin Kazan	30	9	11	10	36	30	+6	38 (Note: Rubin Kazan ahead of Amkar Perm on head-to-head points; Rubin Kazan–Amkar Perm 3–0, Amkar Perm–Rubin Kazan 0–0.)	
10	Amkar Perm	30	9	11	10	36	37	−1	38	
11	Ural Sverdlovsk Oblast	30	9	7	14	28	46	−18	34	

Source: Russian Premier League
Rules for classification: 1) points; 2) number of wins; 3) head-to-head points; 4) number of head-to-head wins; 5) head-to-head goal difference; 6) number of head-to-head goals scored; 7) number of head-to-head away goals scored; 8) goal difference; 9) number of goals scored; 10) number of away goals scored; 11) position in the 2012–13 season (only used until all the regularly scheduled games have been played); 11) extra play-off game or tournament between the teams in question.

==== Matches ====
14 July 2013 1	Kuban Krasnodar	1 – 1	Rubin Kazan'	Krasnodar
21:00 MSK (UTC+4)	Özbiliz 74'	Summary	Ryazantsev (red card) 45+1'; R.Eremenko 71'	Stadium: Kuban Stadium; Attendance: 19,943; Referee: Sergey Karasev

21 July 2013 2	Rubin Kazan'	2 – 1	Zenit Saint Petersburg	Kazan
13:30 MSK (UTC+4)	Gökdeniz 51'; Rondón 90+5'	Summary	Danny 6'	Stadium: Central Stadium; Attendance: 15,142; Referee: Vitali Meshkov

28 July 2013 3	Terek Grozny	0 – 0	Rubin Kazan'	Grozny
22:00 MSK (UTC+4)		Summary		Stadium: Terek Stadium; Attendance: 14,300; Referee: Sergei Ivanov

3 August 2013 4	Rubin Kazan'	0 – 0	CSKA Moscow	Kazan
13:30 MSK (UTC+4)		Summary		Stadium: Central Stadium; Attendance: 20,087; Referee: Aleksandr Egorov

18 August 2013 5	Spartak Moscow	0 – 0	Rubin Kazan'	Lokomotiv Stadium
15:45 MSK (UTC+4)		Summary		Stadium: Moscow; Attendance: 24,300; Referee: Alexey Nikolaev

25 August 2013 6	Rubin Kazan'	1 – 1	Krylia Sovetov	Kazan
17:30 MSK (UTC+4)	Karadeniz 10'	Summary	Tsallagov 45+1'	Stadium: Central Stadium; Attendance: 10,024; Referee: Mikhail Vilkov

1 September 2013 7	Ural	0 – 3	Rubin Kazan'	Yekaterinburg
13:30 MSK (UTC+4)		Summary	Rondón 17', 55', 75'	Stadium: Central Stadium; Attendance: 17,000; Referee: Vladimir Kazmenko

15 September 2013 8	Amkar Perm	0 – 0	Rubin Kazan'	Perm
18:00 MSK (UTC+4)	Semyonov (yellow card) 59' (yellow-red card) 84'	Summary		Stadium: Zvezda Stadium; Attendance: 12,700; Referee: Aleksandr Egorov

22 September 2013 9	Rubin Kazan'	1 – 2	Tom Tomsk	Kazan
16:00 MSK (UTC+4)	Rondón 15'; Ryazantsev (red card) 33'	Summary	Panchenko 34' (pen.); Bardachow 87'	Stadium: Central Stadium; Attendance: 7,044; Referee: Vyacheslav Kharlamov

26 September 2013 10	Rubin Kazan'	2 – 2	Dynamo Moscow	Kazan
20:30 MSK (UTC+4)	Samba 34' (o.g.); Karadeniz 57'; Marcano (yellow card) 20' (yellow-red card) 70'	Summary	Kokorin 39'; Ionov 49'; Kurányi (yellow card) 90+2' (yellow-red card) 90+3'	Stadium: Central Stadium; Attendance: 7,802; Referee: Sergey Lapochkin

29 September 2013 11	Krasnodar	1 – 0	Rubin Kazan'	Kuban Stadium
18:00 MSK (UTC+4)	Pereyra 3'; Granqvist (red card) 29'	Summary		Stadium: Krasnodar; Attendance: 5,200; Referee: Vladislav Bezborodov

6 October 2013 12	Rubin Kazan'	5 – 1	Anzhi Makhachkala	Kazan
18:00 MSK (UTC+4)	Wakaso 11'; Ryazantsev 30'; Mukhametshin 70'; Azmoun 90+1'; Eremenko 90+3' (pen.)	Summary	Abdulavov 85'	Stadium: Central Stadium; Attendance: 5,121; Referee: Alexey Nikolaev

20 October 2013 13	Volga Nizhny Novgorod	2 – 1	Rubin Kazan'	Nizhny Novgorod
20:15 MSK (UTC+4)	Danilenko 11'; Bibilov 49'	Summary	Prudnikov 90+2'	Stadium: Lokomotiv Stadium; Attendance: 5,200; Referee: Aleksey Eskov

27 October 2013 14	Rubin Kazan'	1 – 2	Lokomotiv Moscow	Kazan
13:30 MSK (UTC+4)	Ryazantsev 60'	Report	52' Pavlyuchenko; 84' N'Doye	Stadium: Central Stadium (Kazan); Attendance: 6,742; Referee: Sergei Ivanov

3 November 2013 15	Rostov	0 – 0	Rubin Kazan'	Rostov-on-Don
15:45 MSK (UTC+4)		Summary		Stadium: Olimp – 2 Attendance: 8,500; Referee: Timur Arslanbekov

10 November 2013 16	Rubin Kazan'	0 – 1	Krasnodar	Kazan
18:00 MSK (UTC+4)		Summary	Wánderson 75'	Stadium: Central Stadium; Attendance: 4,091; Referee: Igor Fedotov

23 November 2013 17	Tom Tomsk	0 – 1	Rubin Kazan'	Trud Stadium
12:30 MSK (UTC+4)	Golyshev (red card) 63'	Summary	Kislyak 80'	Stadium: Tomsk; Attendance: 3,200; Referee: Igor Nizovtsev

2 December 2013 18	Rubin Kazan'	3 – 0	Amkar Perm	Kazan
19:30 MSK (UTC+4)	Natcho 38'; Rondón 68'; Kuzmin 77'	Summary		Stadium: Central Stadium; Attendance: 3,073; Referee: Aleksey Eskov

7 December 2013 19	Lokomotiv Moscow	0 – 0	Rubin Kazan'	Moscow
18:30 MSK (UTC+3)	Diarra (yellow card) 90+1' (yellow-red card)	Report		Stadium: Lokomotiv Stadium; Attendance: 10,075; Referee: Sergey Karasev

9 March 2014 20	Anzhi Makhachkala	1 – 0	Rubin Kazan'	Kaspiysk
16:00 (UTC+4)	Bukharov 83'	Summary		Stadium: Anzhi-Arena; Attendance: 18,700; Referee: Aleksey Eskov

16 March 2013 21	Rubin Kazan'	3 – 1	Volga Nizhny Novgorod	Kazan
18:00 MSK (UTC+4)	Dević 14'; Torbinski 44'; Mogilevets 80'	Summary	Sarkisov 81'	Stadium: Kazan Arena; Attendance: 4,109; Referee: Aleksandr Egorov

23 March 2014 22	Dynamo Moscow	0 – 0	Rubin Kazan'	Moscow
13:30 MSK (UTC+4)		Summary		Stadium: Arena Khimki; Attendance: 8,687; Referee: Mikhail Vilkov

30 March 2014 23	Rubin Kazan'	1 – 2	Rostov	Kazan
18:00 MSK (UTC+4)	Azmoun 3'; Ryzhikov (red card)	Summary	Kalachev 32'; Ananidze 44'	Stadium: Kazan Arena; Attendance: 3,271; Referee: Sergey Lapochkin

6 April 2014 24	Zenit St. Petersburg	6 – 2	Rubin Kazan'	Saint Petersburg
13:30 MSK (UTC+4)	Hulk 19' (pen.), 35' (pen.); Rondón 68', 78', 90'; Danny 75'	Summary	Azmoun 64'; Eremenko 82' (pen.)	Stadium: Petrovsky Stadium; Attendance: 17,880; Referee: Timur Arslanbekov

13 April 2014 25	Rubin Kazan'	0 – 2	Kuban Krasnodar	Kazan
16:00 MSK (UTC+4)		Summary	Melgarejo 12'; Bucur 48'	Stadium: Central Stadium; Attendance: 3,349; Referee: Kirill Levnikov

20 April 2014 26	Rubin Kazan'	2 – 1	Spartak Moscow	Kazan
13:30 MSK (UTC+4)	Dević 67'; Prudnikov 90+2'	Summary	Movsisyan 56'	Stadium: Central Stadium; Attendance: 13,118; Referee: Mikhail Vilkov

27 April 2014 27	CSKA Moscow	2 – 1	Rubin Kazan'	Moscow
13:30 MSK (UTC+4)	Dzagoev 13'; Doumbia 53' (pen.)	Summary	Prudnikov 48'	Stadium: Arena Khimki; Attendance: 10,200; Referee: Sergey Karasev

4 May 2014 28	Rubin Kazan'	1 – 0	Ural	Kazan
16:30 MSK (UTC+4)	Navas 39'	Summary		Stadium: Central Stadium; Attendance: 3,957; Referee: Igor Fedotov

10 May 2014 29	Krylia Sovetov	0 – 4	Rubin Kazan'	Metallurg Stadium
15:15 MSK (UTC+4)		Summary	Wakaso 23'; Mogilevets 63'; Azmoun 74'; Dević 90'	Stadium: Samara; Attendance: 11,900; Referee: Timur Arslanbekov

15 May 2014 30	Rubin Kazan'	1 – 1	Terek Grozny	Kazan
18:30 MSK (UTC+4)	Mullin 60'	Summary	Semyonov 58'	Stadium: Central Stadium; Attendance: 3,887; Referee: Vladislav Bezborodov

=== Russian Cup ===
30 October 2013 Fifth Round	Luch-Energiya Vladivostok	4 – 2	Rubin Kazan	Vladivostok
11:30 MSK (UTC+4)	Dorozhkin 3', 54'; Krendelew 36'; Mogilevskiy 45'	Summary	Mukhametshin 15'; Karadeniz 71'	Stadium: Dynamo Stadium; Attendance: 7,450; Referee: Mikhail Belov

=== UEFA Europa League ===
==== Qualifying stages ====
18 July 2013 2nd Round 1st leg	Jagodina (Serbia)	2 – 3	(Russia) Rubin Kazan	Jagodina, Serbia
22:00 MSK (UTC+4)	Damjanović 72'; Lepović 90+2'	Report	Prudnikov 12'; Natcho 21'; Rondón 87'	Stadium: Jagodina City Stadium; Attendance: 4,000; Referee: Kenn Hansen (Denmark)

25 July 2013 2nd Round 2nd leg	Rubin Kazan (Russia)	1 – 0 (4 – 2 agg.)	(Serbia) Jagodina	Kazan, Russia
19:00 MSK (UTC+4)	Karadeniz 52'	Report		Stadium: Central Stadium; Attendance: 5,986; Referee: Antti Munukka (Finland)

1 August 2013 3rd Round 1st leg	Randers (Denmark)	1 – 2	(Russia) Rubin Kazan	Randers, Denmark
20:30 MSK (UTC+4)	Borring 61'	Report	Torbinski 12'; Rondón 42'	Stadium: AutoC Park Randers; Attendance: 3,153; Referee: Fernando Teixeira Vitienes (Spain)

8 August 2013 3rd Round 2nd leg	Rubin Kazan (Russia)	2 – 0 (4 – 1 agg.)	(Denmark) Randers	Kazan, Russia
20:00 MSK (UTC+4)	Navas 18'; Eremenko 86'	Report		Stadium: Central Stadium; Attendance: 5,012; Referee: Kevin Clancy (Scotland)

22 August 2013 Playoff Round 1st leg	Molde (Norway)	0 – 2	(Russia) Rubin Kazan	Molde, Norway
21:00 MSK (UTC+4)		Report	Rondón 21', 90'	Stadium: Aker Stadion; Attendance: 4,384; Referee: Alon Yefet (Israel)

29 August 2013 Playoff Round 2nd leg	Rubin Kazan (Russia)	3 – 0 (5 – 0 agg.)	(Norway) Molde	Kazan, Russia
19:00 MSK (UTC+4)	Prudnikov 33'; Eremenko 50'; Azmoun 84'	Report		Stadium: Central Stadium; Attendance: 4,500; Referee: Sascha Kever (Switzerland)

==== Group stage ====
Pos	Team	Pld	W	D	L	GF	GA	GD	Pts	Qualification	RUB	MAR	ZUL	WIG
1	(Russia) Rubin Kazan	6	4	2	0	14	4	+10	14	Advance to knockout phase	—	1–1	4–0	1–0
2	(Slovenia) Maribor	6	2	1	3	9	12	−3	7 (Note: Tied on head-to-head points (3). Head-to-head goal difference: Maribor +1, Zulte Waregem −1.)	Advance to knockout phase	2–5	—	0–1	2–1
3	(Belgium) Zulte Waregem	6	2	1	3	4	10	−6	7		0–2	1–3	—	0–0
4	(England) Wigan Athletic	6	1	2	3	6	7	−1	5		1–1	3–1	1–2	—

Source: Soccerway
Notes:

19 September 2013 1	Maribor (Slovenia)	2 – 5	(Russia) Rubin Kazan	Maribor, Slovenia
21:00 MSK (UTC+4)	Milec 35'; Fajić 73'	Report	Gökdeniz 23'; Marcano 27'; Eremenko 69'; Rondón 90'; Ryazantsev 90+4'	Stadium: Ljudski vrt Attendance: 7,500; Referee: Pol van Boekel (Netherlands)

3 October 2013 2	Rubin Kazan (Russia)	4 – 0	(Belgium) Zulte Waregem	Kazan, Russia
20:00 MSK (UTC+4)	Duplus 60' (o.g.); Eremenko 73'; Ryazantsev 81'; Natcho 89'	Report		Stadium: Central Stadium; Attendance: 4,057; Referee: Kristo Tohver (Estonia)

24 October 2013 3	Wigan Athletic (England)	1 – 1	(Russia) Rubin Kazan	Wigan, England
23:05 MSK (UTC+4)	Powell 40'	Report	Prudnikov 15'	Stadium: DW Stadium; Attendance: 14,723; Referee: Florian Meyer (Germany)

7 November 2013 4	Rubin Kazan (Russia)	1 – 0	(England) Wigan Athletic	Kazan, Russia
21:00 MSK (UTC+4)	Kuzmin 22'	Report		Stadium: Central Stadium; Attendance: 5,579; Referee: Hüseyin Göçek (Turkey)

28 November 2013 5	Rubin Kazan (Russia)	1 – 1	(Slovenia) Maribor	Kazan, Russia
21:00 MSK (UTC+4)	Natcho 43'	Report	Mezga 86'	Stadium: Central Stadium; Attendance: 2,754; Referee: Ivan Kružliak (Slovakia)

12 December 2013 6	Zulte Waregem (Belgium)	0 – 2	(Russia) Rubin Kazan	Bruges, Belgium
22:00 MSK (UTC+4)		Report	Natcho 79' (pen.); Rondón 85'	Stadium: Jan Breydel Stadium; Attendance: 6,083; Referee: Paolo Mazzoleni (Italy)

==== Knockout stages ====
21 February 2014 Round of 32 1st leg	Real Betis (Spain)	1 – 1	(Russia) Rubin Kazan	Seville, Spain
00:05 MSK (UTC+4)	Dídac 3'	Report	Prudnikov (yellow card) 27' (yellow-red card) 28'; Eremenko 74' (pen.)	Stadium: Benito Villamarín; Attendance: 11,825; Referee: Serge Gumienny (Belgium)

27 February 2014 Round of 32 2nd leg	Rubin Kazan (Russia)	0 – 2 (1 – 3 agg.)	(Spain) Real Betis	Kazan, Russia
21:00 MSK (UTC+4)		Report	Nono 45'; Castro 64'	Stadium: Central Stadium; Attendance: 5,102; Referee: Michael Oliver (England)

== Squad statistics ==
As of match played 15 May 2014

=== Appearances ===
No.	Pos	Nat	Player	Total		Premier League		Russian Cup		Europa League	
No.	Pos	Nat	Player	Apps	Goals	Apps	Goals	Apps	Goals	Apps	Goals
1	GK	(Russia) RUS	Sergei Ryzhikov	39	0	29	0	0	0	10	0
2	DF	(Russia) RUS	Oleg Kuzmin	37	2	26+1	1	0	0	9+1	1
4	DF	(Russia) RUS	Taras Burlak	4	0	2	0	0	0	2	0
5	DF	(Georgia (country)) GEO	Solomon Kvirkvelia	22	0	14+4	0	1	0	1+2	0
7	MF	(Russia) RUS	Vladislav Kulik	32	0	15+7	0	1	0	6+3	0
8	MF	(Russia) RUS	Pavel Mogilevets	13	2	10+1	2	0	0	2	0
9	FW	(Russia) RUS	Aleksandr Prudnikov	28	6	6+11	3	0+1	0	6+4	3
10	MF	(Russia) RUS	Dmitri Torbinski	29	2	15+4	1	1	0	8+1	1
11	FW	(Ukraine) UKR	Marko Dević	13	3	11	3	0	0	2	0
15	MF	(Belarus) BLR	Syarhey Kislyak	23	1	11+2	1	1	0	7+2	0
16	FW	(Russia) RUS	Georgi Nurov	6	0	0+6	0	0	0	0	0
19	FW	(Russia) RUS	Kamil Mullin	8	1	1+5	1	0	0	1+1	0
20	MF	(Uzbekistan) UZB	Vagiz Galiulin	1	0	0	0	0	0	1	0
21	MF	(Ghana) GHA	Wakaso	18	2	8+6	2	0	0	1+3	0
22	DF	(France) FRA	Chris Mavinga	15	0	7	0	0	0	7+1	0
23	MF	(Finland) FIN	Roman Eremenko	39	8	18+9	3	1	0	10+1	5
24	GK	(Lithuania) LTU	Giedrius Arlauskis	5	0	0	0	1	0	4	0
33	DF	(Russia) RUS	Inal Getigezhev	10	0	6+1	0	0	0	3	0
37	DF	(Russia) RUS	Elmir Nabiullin	6	0	6	0	0	0	0	0
44	DF	(Spain) ESP	César Navas	42	2	29	1	1	0	9+3	1
61	MF	(Turkey) TUR	Gökdeniz Karadeniz	31	6	20+1	3	1	1	5+4	2
63	MF	(Russia) RUS	Alisher Dzhalilov	3	0	0+1	0	1	0	0+1	0
69	FW	(Iran) IRI	Sardar Azmoun	17	5	9+5	4	0+1	0	0+2	1
76	DF	(Russia) RUS	Roman Sharonov	11	0	1+1	0	1	0	7+1	0
81	FW	(Russia) RUS	Ruslan Mukhametshin	13	2	5+2	0	1	1	4+1	1
87	DF	(Azerbaijan) AZE	Ruslan Abishov	5	0	0	0	0	0	2+3	0
88	MF	(Russia) RUS	Ruslan Kambolov	1	0	1	0	0	0	0	0
90	MF	(France) FRA	Yann M'Vila	32	0	19	0	0	0	12+1	0
91	GK	(Russia) RUS	Yuri Nesterenko	2	0	1+1	0	0	0	0	0
Players away from Rubin on loan:
25	DF	(Spain) ESP	Iván Marcano	28	1	17	0	0	0	11	1
Players who appeared for Rubin no longer at the club:
3	DF	(Argentina) ARG	Cristian Ansaldi	6	0	4	0	0	0	2	0
8	MF	(Russia) RUS	Aleksandr Ryazantsev	26	4	12+3	2	0	0	11	2
66	MF	(Israel) ISR	Bibras Natcho	30	5	18+1	1	0	0	9+2	4
99	FW	(Venezuela) VEN	Salomón Rondón	19	12	9+2	6	0	0	6+2	6

=== Goal Scorers ===
Place	Position	Nation	Number	Name	Championship	Russian Cup	Europa League	Total
1	FW	(Venezuela)	99	Salomón Rondón	6	0	6	12
2	MF	(Finland)	23	Roman Eremenko	3	0	5	8
3	MF	(Turkey)	61	Gökdeniz Karadeniz	3	1	2	6
3	FW	(Russia)	9	Aleksandr Prudnikov	3	0	3	6
5	FW	(Iran)	69	Sardar Azmoun	4	0	1	5
5	MF	(Israel)	66	Bibras Natcho	1	0	4	5
7	MF	(Russia)	8	Aleksandr Ryazantsev	2	0	2	4
8	FW	(Ukraine)	11	Marko Dević	3	0	0	3
9	MF	(Ghana)	21	Wakaso	2	0	0	2
9	MF	(Russia)	8	Pavel Mogilevets	2	0	0	2
9	FW	(Russia)	81	Ruslan Mukhametshin	1	1	0	2
9	MF	(Russia)	10	Dmitri Torbinski	1	0	1	2
9	DF	(Spain)	44	César Navas	1	0	1	2
9	DF	(Russia)	2	Oleg Kuzmin	1	0	1	2
9				Own goal	1	0	1	2
16	MF	(Belarus)	15	Syarhey Kislyak	1	0	0	1
16	FW	(Russia)	19	Kamil Mullin	1	0	0	1
16	DF	(Spain)	25	Iván Marcano	0	0	1	1
				TOTALS	36	2	28	66

=== Disciplinary record ===
Number	Nation	Position	Name	Russian Premier League		Russian Cup		Europa League		Total	
Number	Nation	Position	Name	Yellow card	Red card	Yellow card	Red card	Yellow card	Red card	Yellow card	Red card
1	(Russia)	GK	Sergei Ryzhikov	0	1	0	0	1	0	1	1
2	(Russia)	DF	Oleg Kuzmin	5	0	0	0	3	0	8	0
3	(Argentina)	DF	Cristian Ansaldi	3	0	0	0	0	0	3	0
5	(Georgia (country))	DF	Solomon Kvirkvelia	3	0	0	0	0	0	3	0
7	(Russia)	MF	Vladislav Kulik	3	0	0	0	1	0	4	0
8	(Russia)	MF	Aleksandr Ryazantsev	1	2	0	0	0	0	1	2
9	(Russia)	FW	Aleksandr Prudnikov	2	0	0	0	3	1	5	1
10	(Russia)	MF	Dmitri Torbinski	3	0	0	0	4	0	7	0
11	(Ukraine)	FW	Marko Dević	1	0	0	0	0	0	1	0
15	(Belarus)	MF	Syarhey Kislyak	5	0	1	0	1	0	7	0
19	(Russia)	FW	Kamil Mullin	1	0	0	0	0	0	1	0
21	(Ghana)	MF	Wakaso	4	0	0	0	2	0	6	0
22	(France)	DF	Chris Mavinga	1	0	0	0	2	0	3	0
23	(Finland)	MF	Roman Eremenko	4	0	1	0	1	0	6	0
24	(Lithuania)	GK	Giedrius Arlauskis	0	0	1	0	0	0	1	0
25	(Spain)	DF	Iván Marcano	2	1	0	0	1	0	3	1
33	(Russia)	DF	Inal Getigezhev	1	0	0	0	0	0	1	0
37	(Russia)	DF	Elmir Nabiullin	2	0	0	0	0	0	2	0
44	(Spain)	DF	César Navas	6	0	0	0	4	0	10	0
61	(Turkey)	MF	Gökdeniz Karadeniz	3	0	0	0	1	0	4	0
66	(Israel)	MF	Bibras Natcho	1	0	0	0	1	0	2	0
69	(Iran)	FW	Sardar Azmoun	2	0	0	0	0	0	2	0
76	(Russia)	DF	Roman Sharonov	0	0	0	0	1	0	1	0
81	(Russia)	FW	Ruslan Mukhametshin	1	0	0	0	0	0	1	0
88	(Russia)	MF	Ruslan Kambolov	1	0	0	0	0	0	1	0
90	(France)	MF	Yann M'Vila	5	0	0	0	3	0	8	0
99	(Venezuela)	FW	Salomón Rondón	2	0	0	0	1	0	3	0
			TOTALS	62	4	3	0	30	1	95	5

== Notes ==
Notes

1. Zulte Waregem played their home matches at Jan Breydel Stadium, Bruges instead of their regular stadium, Regenboogstadion, Waregem.
2. Rubin Kazan played their home match at Rubin Stadium, Kazan instead of their regular stadium, Central Stadium, Kazan.
