= 2014–15 FC Rubin Kazan season =

Rubin Kazan
2014–15 season
- Chairman: Valery Sorokin
- Manager: Rinat Bilyaletdinov
- Stadium: Kazan Arena
- Russian Premier League: 5th
- Russian Cup: Quarterfinals vs Lokomotiv Moscow
- Top goalscorer: League: Igor Portnyagin (11); All: Igor Portnyagin (12)
- Highest home attendance: 36,850 vs Lokomotiv Moscow; 17 August 2014
- Lowest home attendance: 2,700 vs Arsenal Tula; 9 March 2015
- Average home league attendance: 13,746; 31 May 2015
Home colours	Away colours	Third colours

The 2014–15 Rubin Kazan season was the 12th successive season that the club will play in the Russian Premier League, the highest tier of association football in Russia. Rubin Kazan will also be taking part in the Russian Cup.

== Squad ==
Note: Flags indicate national team as defined under FIFA eligibility rules; some limited exceptions apply. Players may hold more than one non-FIFA nationality.

No.	Pos.	Nation	Player
1	GK	RUS	Sergei Ryzhikov
2	DF	RUS	Oleg Kuzmin
3	DF	RUS	Elmir Nabiullin
4	DF	URU	Guillermo Cotugno (on loan from Danubio)
5	DF	GEO	Solomon Kvirkvelia
6	MF	RUS	Insar Salakhetdinov
7	FW	RUS	Igor Portnyagin
10	FW	CRO	Marko Livaja
11	MF	RUS	Ilya Shabanov
12	GK	RUS	Alexander Filtsov
15	MF	BLR	Syarhey Kislyak
20	MF	RUS	Vladimir Sobolev
21	FW	RUS	Nikita Vorona
22	FW	RUS	Vladimir Dyadyun
23	DF	GEO	Mamuka Kobakhidze

No.	Pos.	Nation	Player
27	MF	RUS	Magomed Ozdoev (on loan from Lokomotiv Moscow)
29	MF	RUS	Shota Bibilov
33	DF	RUS	Inal Getigezhev
36	GK	IRI	Alireza Haghighi
44	DF	ESP	César Navas
49	DF	RUS	Vitali Ustinov
61	MF	TUR	Gökdeniz Karadeniz
63	MF	RUS	Alisher Dzhalilov
77	MF	BUL	Blagoy Georgiev
81	FW	RUS	Ruslan Mukhametshin
87	MF	BRA	Carlos Eduardo
88	MF	RUS	Ruslan Kambolov
90	MF	FRA	Yann M'Vila
91	GK	RUS	Yuri Nesterenko
99	FW	RUS	Maksim Kanunnikov

=== Out on loan ===
Note: Flags indicate national team as defined under FIFA eligibility rules; some limited exceptions apply. Players may hold more than one non-FIFA nationality.

No.	Pos.	Nation	Player
4	DF	RUS	Taras Burlak (at Krylia Sovetov Samara)
19	FW	RUS	Kamil Mullin (at Sokol Saratov)
69	FW	IRI	Sardar Azmoun (at Rostov)
-	DF	FRA	Chris Mavinga (at Stade Reims until 30 June 2015)

No.	Pos.	Nation	Player
-	MF	RUS	Vladislav Kulik (at Kuban Krasnodar until 30 June 2015)
-	MF	GHA	Mubarak Wakaso (at Celtic until 30 June 2015)
-	FW	RUS	Sergei Davydov (at Torpedo Moscow until 30 June 2015)
-	FW	UKR	Marko Dević (at Al Rayyan)

== Transfers ==
=== Summer ===
In: Note: Flags indicate national team as defined under FIFA eligibility rules; some limited exceptions apply. Players may hold more than one non-FIFA nationality.

No.	Pos.	Nation	Player
7	MF	RUS	Igor Portnyagin (loan return from (Russia) Tom Tomsk)
10	FW	CRO	Marko Livaja (from (Italy) Atalanta)
12	GK	RUS	Aleksandr Filtsov (from (Russia) Krasnodar)
20	MF	RUS	Vladimir Sobolev (from (Russia) Dynamo Moscow)
22	FW	RUS	Vladimir Dyadyun (from (Russia) Dynamo Moscow)
23	DF	GEO	Mamuka Kobakhidze (from (Georgia (country)) Dila Gori)
27	MF	RUS	Magomed Ozdoyev (loan from (Russia) Lokomotiv Moscow)
29	MF	RUS	Shota Bibilov (from (Russia) Volga Nizhny Novgorod)
36	GK	IRI	Alireza Haghighi (loan return from (Portugal) Sporting Covilhã)
49	MF	RUS	Vitali Ustinov (from (Russia) Rotor Volgograd)
63	MF	RUS	Alisher Dzhalilov (loan return from (Russia) Neftekhimik Nizhnekamsk)
77	MF	BUL	Blagoy Georgiev (from (Russia) Amkar Perm)
87	MF	BRA	Carlos Eduardo (loan return from (Brazil) Flamengo)
99	FW	RUS	Maksim Kanunnikov (from (Russia) Amkar Perm)

Out: Note: Flags indicate national team as defined under FIFA eligibility rules; some limited exceptions apply. Players may hold more than one non-FIFA nationality.

No.	Pos.	Nation	Player
7	MF	RUS	Vladislav Kulik (loan to (Russia) Krasnodar)
9	FW	RUS	Aleksandr Prudnikov (to (Russia) Dynamo Moscow)
9	MF	RUS	Pavel Mogilevets (loan return to (Russia) Zenit St.Petersburg)
10	MF	RUS	Dmitri Torbinski (to (Russia) Rostov)
16	FW	RUS	Georgi Nurov (to (Russia) Ural)
18	FW	LAT	Artūrs Karašausks (end of loan from (Latvia) Skonto Riga)
20	MF	UZB	Vagiz Galiullin (to (Russia) Ufa)
22	DF	FRA	Chris Mavinga (loan to (France) Stade Reims)
23	MF	FIN	Roman Eremenko (to (Russia) CSKA Moscow)
35	DF	ESP	Iván Marcano (to (Portugal) Porto, previously on loan to (Greece) Olympiacos)
37	MF	TUR	Gökhan Töre (to (Turkey) Beşiktas, previously on loan)
65	DF	RUS	Maksim Zhestokov (to (Russia) Volga Nizhny Novgorod)
76	DF	RUS	Roman Sharonov (Retired)
81	FW	RUS	Ruslan Mukhametshin (loan to (Russia) Mordovia Saransk)
87	DF	AZE	Ruslan Abışov (loan to (Azerbaijan) Gabala)
90	MF	FRA	Yann M'Vila (loan to (Italy) Internazionale)
—	DF	RUS	Ivan Temnikov (to (Russia) Tom Tomsk)
—	MF	RUS	Alan Kasaev (to (Russia) Lokomotiv Moscow)

=== Winter ===
In: Note: Flags indicate national team as defined under FIFA eligibility rules; some limited exceptions apply. Players may hold more than one non-FIFA nationality.

No.	Pos.	Nation	Player
4	DF	URU	Guillermo Cotugno (loan from (Uruguay) Danubio)
6	MF	RUS	Insar Salakhetdinov (from (Russia) LFK Lokomotiv Moscow)
8	DF	RUS	Ilya Shabanov (from (Russia) LFK Rubin Kazan)
11	MF	RUS	Almaz Sharafeyev
21	FW	RUS	Nikita Vorona
81	FW	RUS	Ruslan Mukhametshin (end of loan to (Russia) Mordovia Saransk)
90	MF	FRA	Yann M'Vila (end of loan to (Italy) Internazionale)

Out: Note: Flags indicate national team as defined under FIFA eligibility rules; some limited exceptions apply. Players may hold more than one non-FIFA nationality.

No.	Pos.	Nation	Player
4	DF	RUS	Taras Burlak (on loan to (Russia) Krylia Sovetov Samara)
11	FW	UKR	Marko Dević (loan to (Qatar) Al Rayyan)
32	MF	RUS	Stefan Balabanov
50	MF	RUS	Ivan Zaytsev (to (Russia) FC Zenit-Izhevsk)
51	DF	RUS	Ayrat Mukhtarov (released)
69	FW	IRI	Sardar Azmoun (on loan to (Russia) Rostov)
87	DF	AZE	Ruslan Abışov (to (Azerbaijan) Gabala, previously on loan)

== Competitions ==
=== Russian Premier League ===
==== Results by round ====
Round	1	2	3	4	5	6	7	8	9	10	11	12	13	14	15	16	17	18	19	20	21	22	23	24	25	26	27	28	29	30
Ground	H	A	A	H	H	H	A	A	H	H	A	H	A	A	H	H	A	H	H	A	A	H	A	H	A	A	H	A	A	A
Result	L	D	D	D	W	D	W	L	W	W	W	D	L	W	D	L	W	W	W	W	W	L	D	W	L	D	W	L	L	
Position	14	13	11	12	9	10	8	9	8	8	6	6	9	9	8	9	7	6	6	4	4	5	5	5	5	5	5	5	5	

Updated to match(es) played on 27 May 2015. Source: Russian Premier League
A = Away; H = Home; W = Win; D = Draw; L = Loss

==== Matches ====
1 August 2014 1	Rubin Kazan	0–4	Spartak Moscow	Kazan
20:00 MSK (UTC+4)		Summary	Dzyuba 26', 54'; Glushakov 75'; Barrios 89'	Stadium: Central Stadium; Attendance: 20,624; Referee: Vitaly Meshkov

9 August 2014 2	Terek Grozny	1–1	Rubin Kazan	Grozny
20:00 MSK (UTC+4)	Ailton 59'	Summary	Azmoun 87'	Stadium: Akhmat-Arena; Attendance: 22,730; Referee: Alexey Nikolaev

13 August 2014 3	Arsenal Tula	0–0	Rubin Kazan	Tula
20:00 MSK (UTC+4)		Summary		Stadium: Arsenal Stadium; Attendance: 15,000; Referee: Igor Nizovtsev

17 August 2014 4	Rubin Kazan	1–1	Lokomotiv Moscow	Kazan
18:30 MSK (UTC+4)	Karadeniz 31' (pen.)	Summary	Miranchuk 26'	Stadium: Kazan Arena; Attendance: 36,850; Referee: Mikhail Vilkov

23 August 2014 5	Rubin Kazan	2–1	CSKA Moscow	Kazan
20:00 MSK (UTC+4)	Portnyagin 17'; Karadeniz 83'	Summary	Natcho 45' (pen.)	Stadium: Kazan Arena; Attendance: 34,622; Referee: Sergei Ivanov

31 August 2014 6	Rubin Kazan	1–1	Ufa	Kazan
16:00 MSK (UTC+4)	Kanunnikov 44'	Summary	Marcinho 90+5'	Stadium: Kazan Arena; Attendance: 24,538; Referee: Kirill Levnikov

13 September 2014 7	Rostov	1–2	Rubin Kazan	Rostov-on-Don
21:00 MSK (UTC+4)	Grigoryev 9'	Summary	Portnyagin 11', 37'	Stadium: Olimp-2; Attendance: 8,100; Referee: Vladislav Bezborodov

20 September 2014 8	Kuban	2–1	Rubin Kazan	Krasnodar
17:00 MSK (UTC+4)	Danilo 28'; Oliseh 45+2'	Summary	Kanunnikov 14'	Stadium: Kuban; Attendance: 9,111; Referee: Sergey Kulikov

29 September 2014 9	Rubin Kazan	2–1	Torpedo Moscow	Kazan
20:00 MSK (UTC+4)	Eduardo 68'; Georgiev 87'	Summary	Stevanović 15' (pen.)	Stadium: Kazan Arena; Attendance: 5,800; Referee: Sergey Lapochkin

20 October 2014 10	Rubin Kazan	5–0	Mordovia Saransk	Kazan
18:30 MSK (UTC+3)	Portnyagin 12'; Kanunnikov 70'; Karadeniz 79', 85' (pen.); Carlos Eduardo 81'	Summary		Stadium: Kazan Arena; Attendance: 9,132; Referee: Igor Fedotov

27 October 2014 11	Dynamo Moscow	0–2	Rubin Kazan	Moscow
18:30 MSK (UTC+3)		Summary	Ozdoev 48'; Kanunnikov 71'	Stadium: Arena Khimki; Attendance: 5,137; Referee: Igor Nizovtsev

3 November 2014 12	Rubin Kazan	1–1	Amkar Perm	Kazan
18:30 MSK (UTC+3)	Karadeniz 90'	Summary	Jovičić 90+3'	Stadium: Kazan Arena; Attendance: 12,701; Referee: Aleksey Eskov

9 November 2014 13	Krasnodar	2–0	Rubin Kazan	Krasnodar
15:45 MSK (UTC+3)	Petrov 8'; Laborde 72'	Summary		Stadium: Kuban; Attendance: 10,120; Referee: Aleksei Matyunin

22 November 2014 14	Ural	1–3	Rubin Kazan	Yekaterinburg
11:00 MSK (UTC+3)	Fidler (yellow card) 13'; Gogniyev 77'	Summary	Karadeniz 13'; Ozdoyev (yellow card) 47' (goal) 64'; Portnyagin 62'; Carlos Eduardo (yellow card) 89'; Ryzhikov (yellow card) 90+1'	Stadium: Central Stadium; Attendance: 4,200; Referee: Alexey Nikolaev

30 November 2014 15	Rubin Kazan	1–1	Dynamo Moscow	Kazan
16:00 MSK (UTC+3)	Portnyagin 23'; Kuzmin (yellow card) 39'; Georgiev (yellow card) 58'	Summary	Douglas (yellow card) 18'; Büttner (yellow card) 34'; Valbuena (yellow card) 45+2'; Dzsudzsák 78'; Yusupov (yellow card) 80'	Stadium: Kazan Arena; Attendance: 12,000; Referee: Aleksandr Egorov

3 December 2014 16	Rubin Kazan	0–1	Zenit St.Petersburg	Kazan
17:45 MSK (UTC+3)	Karadeniz (yellow card) 30'; Georgiev (yellow card) 48'; Portnyagin (yellow card) 78'	Summary	Criscito (yellow card) 51'; Witsel (yellow card) 55' (goal) 68'; Tymoshchuk (yellow card) 81'	Stadium: Kazan Arena; Attendance: 14,340; Referee: Sergey Karasev

8 December 2014 17	Mordovia Saransk	0–1	Rubin Kazan	Saransk
17:00 MSK (UTC+3)	Shitov (yellow card) 3'; Danilo (yellow card) 18'; Nakhushev (yellow card) 22'; Perendija (yellow card) 82'	Summary	Carlos Eduardo 42'; Kuzmin (yellow card) 56'; Kvirkvelia (yellow card) 57'; Kambolov (yellow card) 88'	Stadium: Start Stadium; Attendance: 4,370; Referee: Aleskey Eskov

9 March 2015 18	Rubin Kazan	1–0	Arsenal Tula	Kazan
15:30 MSK (UTC+3)	Portnyagin 5'; Karadeniz (yellow card) 60'	Summary	Osipov (yellow card) 50'; Kašćelan (yellow card) 80'	Stadium: Kazan Arena; Attendance: 2,700; Referee: Vitaly Rushakov

15 March 2015 19	Rubin Kazan	2–1	Terek Grozny	Kazan
18:30 MSK (UTC+3)	Kanunnikov 15'; Portnyagin 44'; Navas (yellow card) 50'; Livaja (yellow card) 90+3'	Summary	Kanu (yellow card) 62'; Kudryashov (red card) 76'; Komorowski 83'; Semyonov (yellow card) 90+3'	Stadium: Kazan Arena; Attendance: 3,597; Referee: Sergei Ivanov

21 March 2015 20	Rubin Kazan	2–0	Rostov	Kazan
14:15 MSK (UTC+3)	Nabiullin (yellow card) 25'; Portnyagin 84'; Kuzmin (yellow card) 85'; Ozdoyev (yellow card) 90+2'	Summary	Gațcan (yellow card) 21'; Kalachev (yellow card) 27'; Dyakov (yellow card) 69'	Stadium: Kazan Arena; Attendance: 5,027; Referee: Alexey Nikolaev

4 April 2015 21	Amkar Perm'	0–3	Rubin Kazan	Perm
12:00 MSK (UTC+3)	Cherenchikov (yellow card) 58'; Jovičić (yellow card) 73'; Kolomeytsev (yellow card) 84'; Belorukov (yellow card) 90+1'	Summary	Kuzmin (yellow card) 22'; Portnyagin 45+1', 81'; Kvirkvelia (yellow card) 53'; Jovičić 65'; Navas (yellow card) 76'	Stadium: Zvezda Stadium; Attendance: 8,600; Referee: Sergey Lapochkin

7 April 2014 22	Rubin Kazan	1–2	Krasnodar	Kazan
20:00 MSK (UTC+3)	Dyadyun 22'; Nabiullin (yellow card) 31'; Ozdoyev (yellow card) 54'; Georgiev (yellow card) 72'	Summary	Pereyra 32', 85'; Laborde (yellow card) 42'; Ahmedov (yellow card) 76'; Bystrov (yellow card) 90+1'; Dykan (yellow card) 90+2'	Stadium: Kazan Arena; Attendance: 3,615; Referee: Igor Nizovtsev

12 April 2015 23	Zenit St.Petersburg	1–1	Rubin Kazan	Saint Petersburg
13:30 MSK (UTC+3)	Hulk 48' (pen.); Rondón (yellow card) 54'; Criscito (yellow card) 55' (yellow-red card) 58'; García (yellow card) 66'; Shatov (yellow card) 84'	Summary	Nabiullin 4'; Kislyak (yellow card) 48'; Navas (yellow card) 54'; Cotugno (yellow card) 55'; Kvirkvelia (yellow card) 61'; Georgiev (yellow card) 84'; Akhmetov (yellow card) 90+3'	Stadium: Petrovsky Stadium; Attendance: 17,581; Referee: Sergey Karasev

18 April 2014 24	Rubin Kazan	2–1	Ural	Kazan
19:00 MSK (UTC+3)	Ozdoev (yellow card) 25' (goal) 53'; Dyadyun 45+2'	Summary	Khozin (yellow card) 27'; Yerokhin 90+2'	Stadium: Central Stadium; Attendance: 3,147; Referee: Aleksey Eskov

26 April 2014 25	Spartak Moscow	1–0	Rubin Kazan	Moscow
13:30 MSK (UTC+3)	Tasci (yellow card) 3'; Insaurralde (yellow card) 75'; Promes 90+1'	Summary	Ozdoev (yellow card) 4'; Kuzmin (yellow card) 6'; Navas (yellow card) 53'; Dyadyun (yellow card) 80'	Stadium: Otkrytie Arena; Attendance: 20,777; Referee: Vladislav Bezborodov

3 May 2015 26	Torpedo Moscow	2–2	Rubin Kazan	Ramenskoye
18:30 MSK (UTC+4)	Mikuckis (yellow card) 45+1'; Putsila (yellow card) 75'; Kombarov 78'; Smárason 89'; Zenjov (yellow card) 90+2'	Summary	Kvirkvelia (yellow card) 6' (goal) 23'; Ozdoev 71' (yellow card) 77'	Stadium: Saturn Stadium; Referee: Sergey Kulikov

8 May 2015 27	Rubin Kazan	1–0	Kuban Krasnodar	Kazan
19:00 MSK (UTC+4)	Kuzmin (yellow card) 9'; Kvirkvelia (yellow card) 24'; Ozdoev 71'; Kanunnikov (yellow card) 79'; Kislyak (yellow card) 90+1'	Summary	Kaboré (yellow card) 9'; Almeida (yellow card) 31'; Rabiu (yellow card) 77' (yellow-red card)	Stadium: Central Stadium; Attendance: 4,006; Referee: Alexey Nikolaev

16 May 2015 28	Lokomotiv Moscow	3–0	Rubin Kazan	Moscow
19:00 MSK (UTC+3)	Boussoufa (yellow card) 37' (goal) 39'; Pavlyuchenko 56'; Shishkin (yellow card) 82'; Samedov 90' (pen.)	Summary	Georgiev (yellow card) 16'; Kuzmin (yellow card) 59'; Navas (yellow card) 64'	Stadium: Lokomotiv Stadium; Attendance: 4,730; Referee: Sergei Ivanov

25 May 2015 29	CSKA Moscow	3–0	Rubin Kazan	Khimki
20:45 MSK (UTC+3)	Tošić 43', 54'; Eremenko 59'; Wernbloom (yellow card) 70'	Summary	Nabiullin (yellow card) 36'; Kuzmin (yellow card) 61'	Stadium: Arena Khimki; Attendance: 10,000; Referee: Sergey Lapochkin

30 May 2015 30	Ufa	1–1	Rubin Kazan	Perm
13:30 MSK (UTC+3)	Stotskiy 33'; Sukhov (yellow card) 47'; Safronidi (yellow card) 52'; Paurević (yellow card) 64'; Diego (yellow card) 90'	Summary	Kuzmin (yellow card) 45+2'; Karadeniz 65' (yellow card) 85'; Kvirkvelia (yellow card) 87'; Kambolov (yellow card) 90+3'	Stadium: Zvezda Stadium; Attendance: 2,560; Referee: Alexey Nikolaev

==== League table ====
Pos	Team	Pld	W	D	L	GF	GA	GD	Pts	Qualification or relegation
3	Krasnodar	30	17	9	4	52	27	+25	60	Qualification for the Europa League third qualifying round
4	Dynamo Moscow	30	14	8	8	53	36	+17	50	
5	Rubin Kazan	30	13	9	8	39	33	+6	48	Qualification for the Europa League third qualifying round
6	Spartak Moscow	30	12	8	10	42	42	0	44	
7	Lokomotiv Moscow	30	11	10	9	31	25	+6	43	Qualification for the Europa League group stage (Note: Lokomotiv Moscow qualified for Europa League group stage by winning the 2014–15 Russian Cup.)

Source: Russian Premier League
Rules for classification: 1) points; 2) number of matches won; 3) head-to-head points; 4) head-to-head wins; 5) head-to-head goal difference; 6) head-to-head goals; 7) number of head-to-head away goals; 8) goal difference; 9) number of goals scored; 10) number of away goals scored

=== Russian Cup ===
24 September 2014 Round of 32	Luch-Energiya	0–2	Rubin Kazan	Vladivostok
12:30 MSK (UTC+4)		Summary	Dyadyun 20'; Portnyagin 41'	Stadium: Dynamo Stadium; Attendance: 1,000; Referee: Aleksey Sukhoy

30 October 2014 Round of 16	Rubin Kazan	2–0 (a.e.t.)	Spartak Moscow	Kazan
20:00 MSK (UTC+4)	Livaja 108'; Azmoun 120+6' (pen.)	Summary	Costa (yellow card) 26' (yellow-red card) 110'	Stadium: Kazan Arena; Attendance: 27,229; Referee: Kirill Levnikov

3 March 2015 Quarterfinals	Lokomotiv Moscow	0–0 (4–2 p)	Rubin Kazan	Moscow
20:00 MSK (UTC+4)		Summary		Stadium: Lokomotiv; Attendance: 8,223; Referee: Vladislav Bezborodov
	Penalties
	Fernandes (penalty scored); Samedov (penalty scored); Ćorluka (penalty scored); Skuletic (penalty scored)		Karadeniz (penalty missed); Livaja (penalty missed); Kuzmin (penalty scored); Navas (penalty scored)

== Squad statistics ==
As of match played 30 May 2015

=== Appearances and goals ===
No.	Pos	Nat	Player	Total		Premier League		Russian Cup	
No.	Pos	Nat	Player	Apps	Goals	Apps	Goals	Apps	Goals
1	GK	(Russia) RUS	Sergey Ryzhikov	30	0	27	0	3	0
2	DF	(Russia) RUS	Oleg Kuzmin	30	0	27	0	3	0
3	DF	(Russia) RUS	Elmir Nabiullin	26	0	24+1	0	1	0
4	DF	(Uruguay) URU	Guillermo Cotugno	11	0	9+1	0	1	0
5	DF	(Georgia (country)) GEO	Solomon Kvirkvelia	32	1	29	1	3	0
7	FW	(Russia) RUS	Igor Portnyagin	29	12	25+2	11	2	1
10	FW	(Croatia) CRO	Marko Livaja	13	1	5+6	0	0+2	1
15	MF	(Belarus) BLR	Syarhey Kislyak	17	0	7+7	0	1+2	0
22	FW	(Russia) RUS	Vladimir Dyadyun	25	3	14+8	2	3	1
23	DF	(Georgia (country)) GEO	Mamuka Kobakhidze	5	0	3+1	0	1	0
27	MF	(Russia) RUS	Magomed Ozdoev	32	6	27+2	6	2+1	0
44	DF	(Spain) ESP	César Navas	24	0	21+1	0	2	0
49	DF	(Russia) RUS	Vitali Ustinov	1	0	0+1	0	0	0
61	MF	(Turkey) TUR	Gökdeniz Karadeniz	23	7	19+1	7	2+1	0
77	MF	(Bulgaria) BUL	Blagoy Georgiev	25	1	22	1	3	0
80	DF	(Russia) RUS	Yegor Sorokin	1	0	0+1	0	0	0
85	MF	(Russia) RUS	Ilzat Akhmetov	10	0	0+9	0	0+1	0
87	MF	(Brazil) BRA	Carlos Eduardo	24	3	19+3	3	2	0
88	DF	(Russia) RUS	Ruslan Kambolov	21	0	14+5	0	2	0
91	GK	(Russia) RUS	Yuri Nesterenko	3	0	3	0	0	0
99	MF	(Russia) RUS	Maksim Kanunnikov	28	5	22+4	5	2	0
Players away from the club on loan:
4	DF	(Russia) RUS	Taras Burlak	2	0	2	0	0	0
11	FW	(Ukraine) UKR	Marko Dević	3	0	0+3	0	0	0
21	MF	(Ghana) GHA	Mubarak Wakaso	2	0	1+1	0	0	0
69	FW	(Iran) IRI	Sardar Azmoun	16	2	5+9	1	0+2	1
Players who appeared for Rubin Kazan no longer at the club:
9	MF	(Russia) RUS	Pavel Mogilevets	4	0	4	0	0	0

=== Goal Scorers ===
Place	Position	Nation	Number	Name	Russian Premier League	Russian Cup	Total
1	FW	(Russia)	7	Igor Portnyagin	11	1	12
2	MF	(Turkey)	61	Gökdeniz Karadeniz	7	0	7
3	MF	(Russia)	27	Magomed Ozdoev	6	0	6
4	FW	(Russia)	99	Maksim Kanunnikov	5	0	5
5	MF	(Brazil)	87	Carlos Eduardo	3	0	3
5	FW	(Russia)	22	Vladimir Dyadyun	2	1	3
7	FW	(Iran)	69	Sardar Azmoun	1	1	2
8	MF	(Bulgaria)	77	Blagoy Georgiev	1	0	1
8	DF	(Russia)	3	Elmir Nabiullin	1	0	1
8	DF	(Georgia (country))	5	Solomon Kvirkvelia	1	0	1
8				Own goal	1	0	1
8	FW	(Croatia)	10	Marko Livaja	0	1	1
				TOTALS	39	4	43

=== Disciplinary record ===
Number	Nation	Position	Name	Russian Premier League		Russian Cup		Total	
Number	Nation	Position	Name	Yellow card	Red card	Yellow card	Red card	Yellow card	Red card
1	(Russia)	GK	Sergey Ryzhikov	3	0	0	0	3	0
2	(Russia)	DF	Oleg Kuzmin	12	0	1	0	13	0
3	(Russia)	MF	Elmir Nabiullin	3	0	1	0	4	0
4	(Russia)	DF	Taras Burlak	1	0	0	0	1	0
4	(Uruguay)	DF	Guillermo Cotugno	1	0	0	0	1	0
5	(Georgia (country))	DF	Solomon Kvirkvelia	8	0	0	0	8	0
7	(Russia)	FW	Igor Portnyagin	2	0	0	0	2	0
10	(Croatia)	FW	Marko Livaja	1	0	1	0	2	0
15	(Belarus)	MF	Syarhey Kislyak	2	0	1	0	3	0
21	(Ghana)	MF	Mubarak Wakaso	1	0	0	0	1	0
22	(Russia)	FW	Vladimir Dyadyun	1	0	0	0	1	0
27	(Russia)	MF	Magomed Ozdoev	7	0	0	0	7	0
44	(Spain)	DF	César Navas	6	0	1	0	7	0
61	(Turkey)	MF	Gökdeniz Karadeniz	6	0	1	0	7	0
69	(Iran)	FW	Sardar Azmoun	2	0	0	0	2	0
77	(Bulgaria)	MF	Blagoy Georgiev	11	0	1	0	12	0
85	(Russia)	MF	Ilzat Akhmetov	1	0	0	0	1	0
87	(Brazil)	MF	Carlos Eduardo	2	0	1	0	3	0
88	(Russia)	DF	Ruslan Kambolov	4	0	0	0	4	0
99	(Russia)	FW	Maksim Kanunnikov	2	0	0	0	2	0
			TOTALS	76	0	7	0	83	0

== Notes ==
- MSK time changed from UTC+4 to UTC+3 permanently on 26 October 2014.
