= Batov =

Batov (Russian: Батов) is a Russian male surname, its feminine counterpart is Batova. Notable people with the surname include:

- Maksim Batov (born 1992), Russian footballer
- Pavel Batov (1897–1985), Russian general
