= Ruslan Kambolov =

Russian footballer

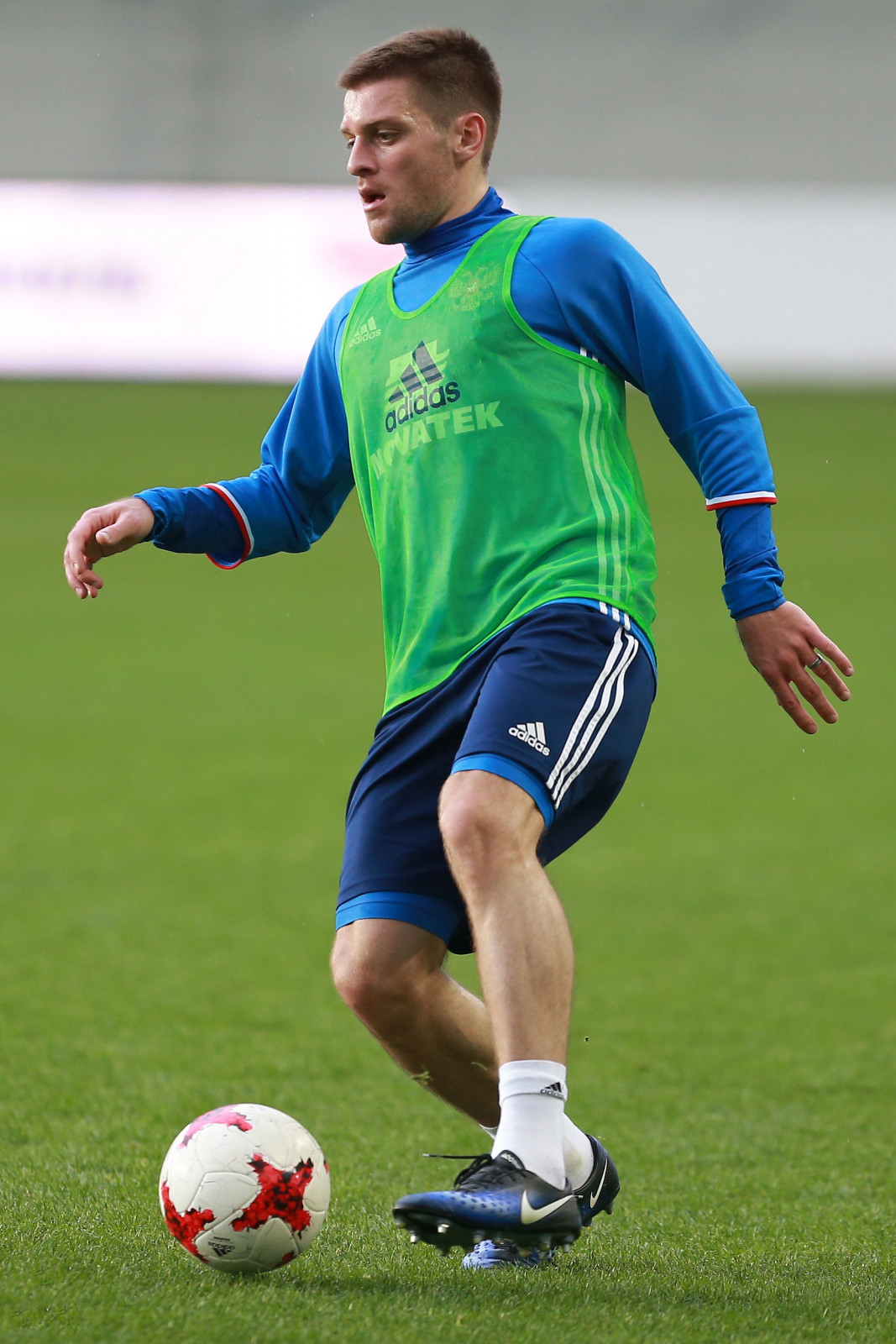
- Kambolov with Rubin in 2019

Personal information
- Full name: Ruslan Aleksandrovich Kambolov
- Date of birth: 1 January 1990 (age 36)
- Place of birth: Vladikavkaz, Russian SFSR
- Height: 1.80 m (5 ft 11 in)
- Positions: Centre back; defensive midfielder

Youth career
- 1997–2004: Alania Vladikavkaz
- 2004–2008: Lokomotiv Moscow

Senior career*
Years	Team	Apps	(Gls)
2007–2010	Lokomotiv Moscow	14	(0)
2011	→ Nizhny Novgorod (loan)	11	(0)
2011–2013	Volgar Astrakhan	11	(0)
2013	Neftekhimik Nizhnekamsk	16	(2)
2014–2019	Rubin Kazan	113	(1)
2019–2021	Krasnodar	26	(0)
2020–2021	→ Krasnodar-2	4	(0)
2021–2022	Arsenal Tula	4	(0)
2022	Aktobe	17	(1)

International career
2009	Russia U-19	7	(1)
2009	Russia U-21	1	(0)
2015–2018	Russia	6	(0)
- * Club domestic league appearances and goals

Ruslan Aleksandrovich Kambolov (Russian: Руслан Александрович Камболов; born 1 January 1990) is a Russian former footballer who played as a centre-back or defensive midfielder.

== Club career ==
On 1 February 2014, he signed with FC Rubin Kazan.

On 10 June 2019, he signed a 2-year contract with FC Krasnodar.

On 7 September 2021, he joined Arsenal Tula. On 14 January 2022, his contract with Arsenal was terminated by mutual consent.

On 5 March 2022, Kambolov signed with FC Aktobe in Kazakhstan.

== International ==
Kambolov made his debut for the Russia national football team on 31 March 2015 in a friendly game against Kazakhstan.

On 11 May 2018, he was included in Russia's extended 2018 FIFA World Cup squad. Due to injury, he was replaced by Sergei Ignashevich on 14 May.

== Career statistics ==
As of match played 2 October 2022

Club	Season	League			Cup		Continental		Total	
Club	Season	Division	Apps	Goals	Apps	Goals	Apps	Goals	Apps	Goals
Lokomotiv Moscow	2007	RPL	1	0	0	0	0	0	1	0
Lokomotiv Moscow	2008	RPL	8	0	2	0	–		10	0
Lokomotiv Moscow	2009	RPL	4	0	1	0	–		5	0
Lokomotiv Moscow	2010	RPL	1	0	0	0	0	0	1	0
Lokomotiv Moscow	Total		14	0	3	0	0	0	17	0
Nizhny Novgorod	2011–12	FNL	11	0	1	0	–		12	0
Volgar Astrakhan	2011–12	FNL	6	0	0	0	–		6	0
Volgar Astrakhan	2012–13	FNL	5	0	0	0	–		5	0
Volgar Astrakhan	Total		11	0	0	0	0	0	11	0
Neftekhimik Nizhnekamsk	2013–14	FNL	16	2	0	0	–		16	2
Rubin Kazan	2013–14	RPL	1	0	–		0	0	1	0
Rubin Kazan	2014–15	RPL	19	0	2	0	–		21	0
Rubin Kazan	2015–16	RPL	27	0	0	0	9 (Note: Appearances in the UEFA Europa League)	0	36	0
Rubin Kazan	2016–17	RPL	19	1	2	0	–		21	1
Rubin Kazan	2017–18	RPL	20	0	1	0	–		21	0
Rubin Kazan	2018–19	RPL	27	0	2	0	–		29	0
Rubin Kazan	Total		113	1	7	0	9	0	129	1
Krasnodar	2019–20	RPL	16	0	1	0	7 (Note: Three appearances in the UEFA Champions League, four appearances in the UEFA Europa League)	0	24	0
Krasnodar	2020–21	RPL	10	0	1	0	3 (Note: Appearances in the UEFA Champions League)	0	14	0
Krasnodar	Total		26	0	2	0	10	0	38	0
Krasnodar-2	2020–21	FNL	4	0	–		–		4	0
Arsenal Tula	2021–22	RPL	4	0	1	0	–		5	0
Aktobe	2022	Kazakhstan Premier League	17	1	3	0	–		20	1
Career total			216	4	17	0	19	0	252	4
