= Magomed Ozdoyev =

Russian footballer (born 1992)

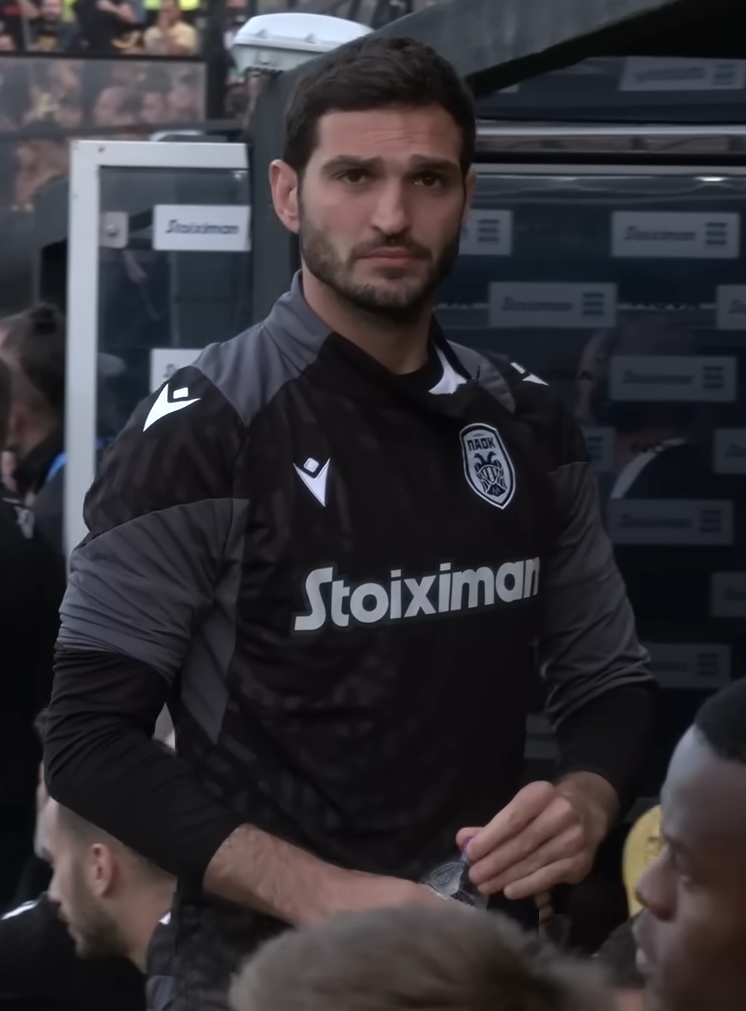
- Ozdoyev with PAOK in 2024

Personal information
- Full name: Magomed Mustafayevich Ozdoyev
- Date of birth: 5 November 1992 (age 34)
- Place of birth: Grozny, Russia
- Height: 1.83 m (6 ft 0 in)
- Position: Midfielder

Team information
- Current team: Krasnodar
- Number: 21

Youth career
- 2004–2006: Malgobek Sport School
- 2007: Angusht Nazran
- 2008: Terek Grozny
- 2008–2009: Dynamo Kyiv

Senior career*
Years	Team	Apps	(Gls)
2010–2015	Lokomotiv Moscow	57	(4)
2014–2015	→ Rubin Kazan (loan)	29	(6)
2015–2018	Rubin Kazan	58	(4)
2018	→ Terek Grozny (loan)	6	(0)
2018–2022	Zenit Saint Petersburg	87	(7)
2022–2023	Fatih Karagümrük	33	(5)
2023–2026	PAOK	88	(15)
2026–	Krasnodar	14	(0)

International career^{‡}
2009	Russia U17	13	(5)
2010	Russia U18	2	(0)
2011	Russia U19	7	(1)
2011–2012	Russia U21	5	(0)
2014–2021	Russia	35	(4)
- * Club domestic league appearances and goals as of 22 November 2026 ‡ National team caps and goals as of 21 June 2021

Magomed Mustafayevich Ozdoyev (Russian: Магомед Мустафаевич Оздоев; born 5 November 1992) is a Russian professional footballer who plays as a central midfielder for Krasnodar.

== Personal life ==
Magomed Ozdoyev was born in Grozny, into an Ingush family, during the year of 1992, but had been forced to abandon Chechnya as for the result of the First Chechen War, which Russian military engaged against Chechen separatists supporting the Chechen Republic of Ichkeria, during these times, his football passion was cherished and tutored under his father, Mustafa. It was considered as the hardest experience for Magomed himself, in an appearance on Russia-1's program in 2017, prior to 2018 FIFA World Cup.

Magomed himself is the grandnephew of the late Ingush World War II ace who served in the Red Army, Murad Ozdoev.

== Club career ==
He made his Russian Premier League debut on 10 July 2010 for Lokomotiv Moscow in a game against FC Anzhi Makhachkala. On 14 July 2014, Ozdoyev was loaned by Lokomotiv Moscow to Russian Football Premier League rivals Rubin Kazan for 1 year with buying option. On 13 February 2017, he was loaned by Rubin Kazan to FC Terek Grozny until the end of the 2016–17 season. On 15 February 2018, he signed a 4.5-year contract with Zenit St. Petersburg. On 25 May 2022, Ozdoyev left Zenit as his contract expired.

On 28 July 2022, Ozdoyev joined Fatih Karagümrük in Turkey. On 7 August 2023, Ozdoyev joined PAOK in Greece. On 7 April 2024 he scored the tying goal against AEK Athens securing a 2–2 away draw. On 6 July 2026, Ozdoyev signed a two-year contract with Krasnodar.

== International career ==
On 11 May 2012, Ozdoyev was named to the Russia's provisional squad for the UEFA Euro 2012. It was the first time he was called up to the national team. He was not included on the final official squad for the competition. He has become the first Ingush to be called to the Russian national team. He made his national team debut on 3 September 2014 in a friendly against Azerbaijan. He scored his first national team goal on 15 November 2016 in a friendly against Romania which finished as a 1–0 victory for Russia in the city of Grozny, where he was born.

On 11 May 2021, he was included in the preliminary extended 30-man squad for UEFA Euro 2020. On 2 June 2021, he was included in the final squad, making history as the first Caucasian Muslim footballer to represent the Russian side in a major competition. He played the full match in Russia's opening game against Belgium on 12 June 2021 as Russia lost 3–0. He again started and was substituted after an hour of play each time in the second game against Finland on 16 June in a 1–0 victory and the last group stage game against Denmark as Russia lost 4–1 and was eliminated.

== Career statistics ==
=== Club ===
As of match played 22 November 2026

Appearances and goals by club, season and competition
Club	Season	League			National cup (Note: Includes Russian Cup, Turkish Cup, Greek Football Cup)		Europe		Other		Total	
Club	Season	Division	Apps	Goals	Apps	Goals	Apps	Goals	Apps	Goals	Apps	Goals
Lokomotiv Moscow	2010	Russian Premier League	3	0	1	0	0	0	—		4	0
Lokomotiv Moscow	2011–12	Russian Premier League	30	1	2	0	7 (Note: Appearances in UEFA Europa League)	0	—		39	1
Lokomotiv Moscow	2012–13	Russian Premier League	10	1	1	0	—		—		11	1
Lokomotiv Moscow	2013–14	Russian Premier League	13	1	1	0	—		—		14	1
Lokomotiv Moscow	Total		56	3	5	0	7	0	—		68	3
Rubin Kazan (loan)	2014–15	Russian Premier League	29	6	3	0	—		—		32	6
Rubin Kazan	2015–16	Russian Premier League	29	2	0	0	10	0	—		39	2
Rubin Kazan	2016–17	Russian Premier League	10	0	2	0	–		–		12	0
Rubin Kazan	2017–18	Russian Premier League	19	1	2	0	–		–		21	1
Rubin Kazan	Total		87	9	7	0	10	0	—		104	9
Terek Grozny (loan)	2016–17	Russian Premier League	6	0	–		–		–		6	0
Zenit Saint Petersburg	2017–18	Russian Premier League	4	0	–		—		—		4	0
Zenit Saint Petersburg	2018–19	Russian Premier League	16	0	2	0	7	1	–		25	1
Zenit Saint Petersburg	2019–20	Russian Premier League	26	3	3	0	6 (Note: Appearances in UEFA Champions League)	1	1 (Note: Appearance in Russian Super Cup)	0	36	4
Zenit Saint Petersburg	2020–21	Russian Premier League	28	0	1	0	5	0	1	1	35	1
Zenit Saint Petersburg	2021–22	Russian Premier League	13	1	1	0	1	1	1	0	16	2
Zenit Saint Petersburg	Total		87	4	7	0	19	3	3	1	116	8
Fatih Karagümrük	2022–23	Süper Lig	33	5	1	0	—		—		34	5
PAOK	2023–24	Super League Greece	34	6	3	0	13 (Note: Appearances in UEFA Europa Conference League)	1	—		50	7
PAOK	2024–25	Super League Greece	24	1	2	0	15 (Note: Four appearances in UEFA Champions League, eleven appearances and one goal in UEFA Europa League)	1	—		41	2
PAOK	2025–26	Super League Greece	30	8	7	1	13	0	—		50	9
PAOK	Total		88	15	12	1	41	2	—		141	18
Krasnodar	2026–27	Russian Premier League	14	0	5	1	—		—		19	1
Career total			371	36	37	2	77	5	3	1	488	44

=== International ===
As of match played 21 June 2021

Appearances and goals by national team and year
National team	Year	Apps	Goals
Russia	2014	4	0
Russia	2015	2	0
Russia	2016	4	1
Russia	2017	2	0
Russia	2019	9	2
Russia	2020	7	1
Russia	2021	7	0
Total		35	4

Scores and results list Russia's goal tally first.

No.	Date	Venue	Opponent	Score	Result	Competition
1	15 November 2016	Akhmat-Arena, Grozny, Russia	Romania	1–0	1–0	Friendly
2	10 October 2019	Luzhniki Stadium, Moscow, Russia	Scotland	2–0	4–0	UEFA Euro 2020 qualification
3	13 October 2019	GSP Stadium, Nicosia, Cyprus	Cyprus	2–0	5–0	UEFA Euro 2020 qualification
4	6 September 2020	Puskás Aréna, Budapest, Hungary	Hungary	2–0	3–2	2020–21 UEFA Nations League B

== Honours ==
Zenit Saint Petersburg

- Russian Premier League: 2018–19, 2019–20, 2020–21, 2021–22
- Russian Cup: 2019–20
- Russian Super Cup: 2020, 2021

PAOK

- Super League Greece: 2023–24
