= Boris Shavlokhov =

Russian footballer

Personal information
- Full name: Boris Mikhailovich Shavlokhov
- Date of birth: 12 June 1996 (age 30)
- Place of birth: Gudauta, Georgia
- Height: 1.81 m (5 ft 11 1/2 in)
- Positions: Forward; midfielder

Youth career
- –2009: FC Spartak Moscow
- 2009–2010: DYuSSh Krylia Sovetov Moscow
- 2010–2012: SDYuShOR Yunost Moskvy-FShM Moscow
- 2012–2013: Fyodor Cherenkov Academy
- 2013–2014: FC Rubin Kazan
- 2014–2015: Krasnodar

Senior career*
Years	Team	Apps	(Gls)
2014–2015	Krasnodar-2	7	(2)
2016	Granit Mikashevichi	14	(0)
- * Club domestic league appearances and goals

Boris Mikhailovich Shavlokhov (Russian: Борис Михайлович Шавлохов; born 12 June 1996) is a Russian former footballer.

Shavlokhov was born in Gudauta, Abkhazia, and moved to Moscow with his family at the age of 6. He was enrolled in the Spartak academy, spent a year at FC FShM Torpedo Moscow, before returning to Spartak.

When he was 16, Shavlokhov joined FC Rubin Kazan, where he played 8 matches and scored 1 goal during the seasons of 2012/13 and 2013/14. After the coach Kurban Berdyev's departure in 2014, Shavlokhov transferred to FC Krasnodar, where he made his professional debut in the Russian Professional Football League on 26 August 2014 in a game against FC Druzhba Maykop. For the rest of the year, he played 10 matches for FC Krasnodar, and 9 matches as a substitute.

At the end of July 2016, he signed a contract with the Belarusian Premier League club FC Granit Mikashevichi, for which he played 14 matches until the end of the championship.
