= Aleksandr Kuznetsov (footballer, born 1997) =

Russian footballer

Personal information
- Full name: Aleksandr Alekseyevich Kuznetsov
- Date of birth: 21 March 1997 (age 29)
- Place of birth: Kazan, Russia
- Height: 1.68 m (5 ft 6 in)
- Position: Defender

Senior career*
Years	Team	Apps	(Gls)
2014–2016	Rubin Kazan	0	(0)
2014–2015	→ Rubin-2 Kazan (loan)	2	(0)
2017–2019	Neftekhimik Nizhnekamsk	37	(1)
- * Club domestic league appearances and goals

Aleksandr Alekseyevich Kuznetsov (Russian: Александр Алексеевич Кузнецов; born 21 March 1997) is a Russian former football player.

== Club career ==
He made his professional debut in the Russian Professional Football League for Rubin-2 Kazan on 18 July 2014 in a game against Syzran-2003.

He played his first game for the main squad of Rubin Kazan on 24 September 2015 in a Russian Cup game against SKA-Energiya Khabarovsk which his team lost 0–2.
