= Guillermo Cotugno =

Uruguayan footballer (born 1995)

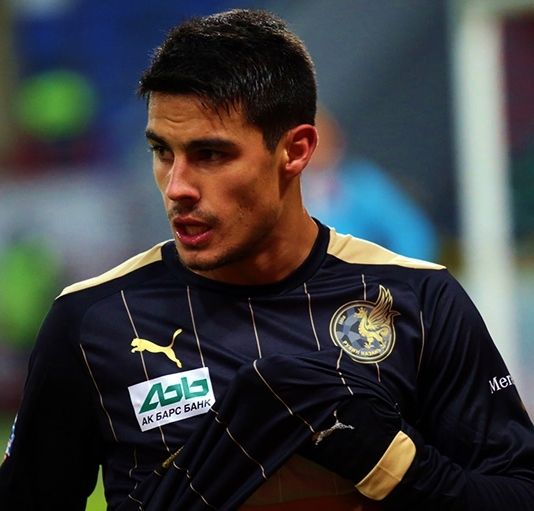

Personal information
- Full name: Guillermo Gastón Cotugno Lima
- Date of birth: 12 March 1995 (age 31)
- Place of birth: Montevideo, Uruguay
- Height: 1.77 m (5 ft 10 in)
- Position: Right-back

Team information
- Current team: Racing de Montevideo
- Number: 4

Youth career
- Danubio

Senior career*
Years	Team	Apps	(Gls)
2014–2015	Danubio	25	(0)
2015	→ Rubin Kazan (loan)	10	(0)
2015–2017	Rubin Kazan	23	(0)
2016–2017	→ Talleres (loan)	8	(0)
2017–2018	Real Oviedo	29	(1)
2018–2019	Nacional	35	(0)
2020–2021	Śląsk Wrocław	12	(0)
2020	Śląsk Wrocław II	4	(0)
2021–2024	Deportivo Maldonado	86	(2)
2024–	Racing de Montevideo	61	(5)

International career
2014–2015	Uruguay U20	22	(0)
Medal record
Men's football
Representing Uruguay
South American U-20 Championship
Third place	2015 Uruguay
- * Club domestic league appearances and goals as of 1 October 2025

Guillermo Gastón Cotugno Lima (born 12 March 1995) is an Uruguayan professional footballer who plays as a right-back for Racing de Montevideo.

== Career ==
In February 2015, Cotugno moved to Russian Premier League side FC Rubin Kazan on loan until the end of the 2014–15 season. Cotugno made his Russian Premier League debut for Rubin Kazan on 9 March 2015 against FC Arsenal Tula. On 19 July 2017, he was released from his Rubin contract by mutual consent.

On 1 August 2017, Cotugno signed a two-year contract with Real Oviedo. The following 20 July, he returned to his home country after agreeing to a deal with Nacional.

== Honours ==
Danubio

- Uruguayan Primera División: 2013–14
