= Maksim Batov =

Russian football player

Personal information
- Full name: Maksim Sergeyevich Batov
- Date of birth: 5 June 1992 (age 34)
- Place of birth: Perm, Russia
- Height: 1.78 m (5 ft 10 in)
- Position: Midfielder

Youth career
- –2006: SDYuSShOR Perm
- 2006–2012: Zenit Saint Petersburg

Senior career*
Years	Team	Apps	(Gls)
2012–2013	Zenit Saint Petersburg	0	(0)
2012–2013	→ Chernomorets Novorossiysk (loan)	22	(0)
2013–2014	Zenit-2 Saint Petersburg	9	(0)
2015	Amkar Perm	10	(0)
2015–2016	Rubin Kazan	3	(0)
2016	→ Orenburg (loan)	5	(0)
2017	Anzhi Makhachkala	2	(0)
2017–2018	Khimki	30	(1)
2018	Luch Vladivostok	6	(0)
2019	Syzran-2003	5	(0)
2019–2021	Tekstilshchik Ivanovo	53	(2)
2021	Leningradets Leningrad Oblast	7	(0)
2022	Tekstilshchik Ivanovo	18	(0)
2023	Dynamo Saint Petersburg	5	(0)

International career
2010	Russia U-18	6	(1)
2011	Russia U-19	4	(0)
- * Club domestic league appearances and goals

Maksim Sergeyevich Batov (Russian: Максим Серге́евич Батов; born 5 June 1992) is a Russian former professional football player.

== Club career ==
Batov made his debut in the Russian Second Division for Chernomorets Novorossiysk on 9 September 2012 in a game against Biolog-Novokubansk.

He made his Russian Premier League debut for Amkar Perm on 9 March 2015 in a game against Torpedo Moscow.

Batov appeared in Europa League qualifiers in 2015 for Rubin Kazan.

== Career statistics ==
Club	Season	League			Cup		Continental		Total	
Club	Season	Division	Apps	Goals	Apps	Goals	Apps	Goals	Apps	Goals
Chernomorets Novorossiysk (loan)	2012–13	Russian Second League	22	0	–		–		22	0
Zenit-2 Saint Petersburg	2013–14	Russian Second League	9	0	–		–		9	0
Amkar Perm	2014–15	Russian Premier League	10	0	–		–		10	0
Rubin Kazan	2015–16	Russian Premier League	3	0	1	0	3 (Note: Appearances in the UEFA Europa League)	0	7	0
Rubin Kazan	2016–17	Russian Premier League	0	0	–		–		0	0
Rubin Kazan	Total		3	0	1	0	3	0	7	0
Orenburg (loan)	2016–17	Russian Premier League	5	0	0	0	–		5	0
Anzhi Makhachkala	2016–17	Russian Premier League	2	0	0	0	–		2	0
Khimki	2017–18	Russian First League	30	1	1	0	–		31	1
Khimki	2018–19	Russian First League	0	0	0	0	–		0	0
Khimki	Total		30	1	1	0	0	0	31	1
Luch Vladivostok	2018–19	Russian First League	6	0	0	0	–		6	0
Syzran-2003	2018–19	Russian Second League	5	0	–		–		5	0
Tekstilshchik Ivanovo	2019–20	Russian First League	21	1	1	0	–		22	1
Tekstilshchik Ivanovo	2020–21	Russian First League	32	1	2	0	–		34	1
Tekstilshchik Ivanovo	2021–22	Russian First League	0	0	–		–		0	0
Tekstilshchik Ivanovo	Total		53	2	3	0	0	0	56	2
Leningradets	2021–22	Russian Second League	7	0	2	0	–		9	0
Tekstilshchik Ivanovo	2022–23	Russian Second League	18	0	3	0	–		21	0
Dynamo Saint Petersburg	2022–23	Russian Second League	5	0	–		–		5	0
Career total			175	3	10	0	3	0	188	3
