= Andrei Mironov (footballer, born 1997) =

Russian footballer

Personal information
- Full name: Andrei Sergeyevich Mironov
- Date of birth: 4 January 1997 (age 29)
- Place of birth: Kazan, Russia
- Height: 1.81 m (5 ft 11 1/2 in)
- Position: Midfielder

Youth career
- 2004–2014: FC Rubin Kazan

Senior career*
Years	Team	Apps	(Gls)
2014–2016	FC Rubin Kazan	0	(0)
2014	→ FC Rubin-2 Kazan	2	(0)
2017	FK Progress Riga	?	(?)
2017–2019	FC Orenburg	0	(0)
2017–2018	→ FC Orenburg-2	19	(0)
2018–2019	→ FC Torpedo Moscow (loan)	11	(0)
2019	Daugavpils	3	(0)
Total		35	(0)

International career
2012	Russia U-15	2	(0)
2014	Russia U-17	6	(0)
2015	Russia U-18	10	(0)
2015–2016	Russia U-19	6	(1)
- * Club domestic league appearances and goals

Andrei Sergeyevich Mironov (Russian: Андрей Сергеевич Миронов; born 4 January 1997) is a Russian former football player. He played as a defensive midfielder.

== Club career ==
He made his professional debut in the Russian Professional Football League for FC Rubin-2 Kazan on 18 July 2014 in a game against FC Syzran-2003 Syzran.

He played his first game for the main squad of FC Rubin Kazan on 24 September 2015 in a Russian Cup game against FC SKA-Energiya Khabarovsk which his team lost 0–2.
