= Nikita Vorona =

Russian footballer

Personal information
- Full name: Nikita Leonidovich Vorona
- Date of birth: 8 July 1995 (age 31)
- Height: 1.76 m (5 ft 9 1/2 in)
- Positions: Midfielder; forward

Team information
- Current team: Dynamo Barnaul
- Number: 23

Senior career*
Years	Team	Apps	(Gls)
2012	Akademiya Tolyatti	5	(1)
2013–2014	Kuban Krasnodar	0	(0)
2015–2016	Rubin Kazan	0	(0)
2015	→ Rubin-2 Kazan	2	(0)
2017	Academia Chișinău	8	(0)
2018	Polimer Barnaul		
2018–2019	Dynamo Barnaul	7	(0)
2022–2026	Temp Barnaul		
2026–	Dynamo Barnaul	29	(8)
- * Club domestic league appearances and goals as of 1 November 2026

Nikita Leonidovich Vorona (Russian: Никита Леонидович Ворона; born 8 July 1995) is a Russian football player who plays for Dynamo Barnaul.

== Club career ==
Vorona made his debut in the Russian Second Division for Akademiya Tolyatti on 24 August 2012 in a game against Volga Ulyanovsk.
