= Gökdeniz Karadeniz =

Turkish footballer (born 1980)

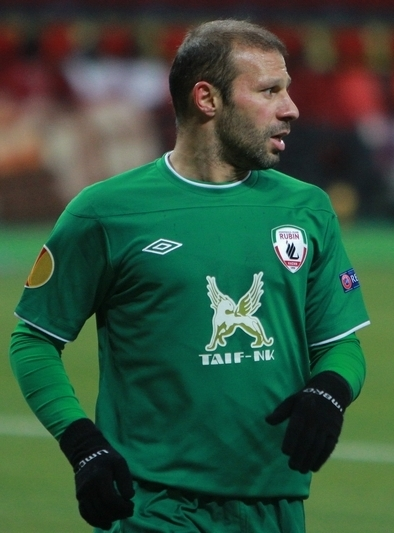
- Karadeniz with Rubin Kazan in 2013

Personal information
- Full name: Gökdeniz Karadeniz
- Date of birth: 11 January 1980 (age 46)
- Place of birth: Giresun, Turkey
- Height: 1.67 m (5 ft 6 in)
- Positions: Winger; attacking midfielder

Youth career
- 1994–1995: Yeniyolspor
- 1995–1997: Trabzonspor

Senior career*
| Years | Team | Apps | (Gls) |
| 1997–2008 | Trabzonspor | 246 | (64) |
| 2008–2018 | Rubin Kazan | 226 | (39) |
| Total | | 472 | (103) |

International career
| 1994 | Turkey U15 | 4 | (0) |
| 1996 | Turkey U16 | 9 | (0) |
| 1996–1997 | Turkey U17 | 12 | (1) |
| 1997 | Turkey U18 | 7 | (0) |
| 2000–2001 | Turkey U21 | 16 | (4) |
| 2002–2003 | Turkey A2 | 2 | (0) |
| 2003–2008 | Turkey | 50 | (6) |

Managerial career
- 2023–2026: Rubin-2 Kazan
Medal record
Men's Football
Representing Turkey
FIFA Confederations Cup
| Third place | 2003 France |
- * Club domestic league appearances and goals

Gökdeniz Karadeniz (born 11 January 1980) is a Turkish professional football coach and a former player who played as a winger or as an attacking midfielder, making over 250 appearances each for Turkish club Trabzonspor and Russian club Rubin Kazan.

== Club career ==
=== Trabzonspor ===
Karadeniz played his first professional match for Trabzonspor in the 1999–00 season at the senior level and made ten appearances. He was at first used in defensive roles by his manager, but was gradually given a more and more offensive role in the team until the 2003–04 season when he was given an attacking midfield role. His lightning step and effective understanding with teammate Fatih Tekke enabled him to lead the club in scoring that season with 13 goals.

=== Rubin Kazan ===
On 13 March 2008, he signed a five-year deal with the Russian club Rubin Kazan worth €8.7 million. Karadeniz mentioned that it was sad for him to leave Turkey and also said he chose the club because he felt that if he had joined a big team in Europe his club would not have gotten as much money for him. He won the Russian Premier League 2008 with Rubin.

On 20 October 2009, Karadeniz scored the winning goal to shock the Barcelona fans at Camp Nou, winning the match for Rubin Kazan.

On 5 May 2018, Karadeniz announced he will be retiring at the end of the 2017–18 season. His shirt number (61) was permanently retired by Rubin.

== International career ==
He played his national team debut against Czech Republic national football team on 30 April 2003. He also played 2 times for Turkey B national football team for Future Cup matches against Scotland and Germany and 16 times for Turkey U21. He was called up for the UEFA Euro 2008 for Turkey.

== Coaching career ==
On 7 July 2023, Karadeniz returned to Rubin Kazan and was appointed manager of their reserve squad Rubin-2 Kazan. He left Rubin-2 in January 2026.

== Career statistics ==
As of match played on 13 May 2018

Appearances and goals by club, season and competition
| Club | Season | League | | | Cup | | Other | | Total | |
| Club | Season | Division | Apps | Goals | Apps | Goals | Apps | Goals | Apps | Goals |
|---|---|---|---|---|---|---|---|---|---|---|
| Trabzonspor | 1997–98 | Süper Lig | 1 | 0 | 1 | 0 | 0 | 0 | 2 | 0 |
| Trabzonspor | 1999–00 | Süper Lig | 10 | 0 | 0 | 0 | 0 | 0 | 10 | 0 |
| Trabzonspor | 2000–01 | Süper Lig | 33 | 5 | 3 | 0 | 0 | 0 | 36 | 5 |
| Trabzonspor | 2001–02 | Süper Lig | 33 | 4 | 3 | 0 | 0 | 0 | 36 | 4 |
| Trabzonspor | 2002–03 | Süper Lig | 31 | 4 | 4 | 3 | 0 | 0 | 35 | 7 |
| Trabzonspor | 2003–04 | Süper Lig | 33 | 14 | 5 | 2 | 0 | 0 | 38 | 16 |
| Trabzonspor | 2004–05 | Süper Lig | 32 | 12 | 3 | 2 | 0 | 0 | 35 | 14 |
| Trabzonspor | 2005–06 | Süper Lig | 15 | 6 | 0 | 0 | 2 (Note: Appearances in UEFA Champions League) | 0 | 17 | 6 |
| Trabzonspor | 2006–07 | Süper Lig | 34 | 8 | 8 | 3 | 0 | 0 | 42 | 11 |
| Trabzonspor | 2007–08 | Süper Lig | 24 | 11 | 4 | 3 | 0 | 0 | 28 | 14 |
| Trabzonspor | Total | | 246 | 64 | 31 | 13 | 2 | 0 | 279 | 77 |
| Rubin Kazan | 2008 | Russian Premier League | 27 | 6 | 0 | 0 | 0 | 0 | 27 | 6 |
| Rubin Kazan | 2009 | Russian Premier League | 25 | 6 | 0 | 0 | 1 (Note: Appearance in Russian Super Cup) | 0 | 26 | 6 |
| Rubin Kazan | 2010 | Russian Premier League | 17 | 1 | 0 | 0 | 16 (Note: Twelves appearances in UEFA Champions League, Four appearances in UEFA Europa League) | 1 | 33 | 2 |
| Rubin Kazan | 2011–12 | Russian Premier League | 35 | 6 | 5 | 2 | 14 (Note: Ten appearances in UEFA Europa League, Four appearances in UEFA Champions League) | 1 | 54 | 9 |
| Rubin Kazan | 2012–13 | Russian Premier League | 28 | 3 | 1 | 0 | 13 (Note: Twelve appearances in UEFA Europa League, One appearance in Russian Super Cup) | 4 | 42 | 7 |
| Rubin Kazan | 2013–14 | Russian Premier League | 21 | 3 | 1 | 1 | 9 (Note: Appearances in UEFA Europa League) | 2 | 31 | 6 |
| Rubin Kazan | 2014–15 | Russian Premier League | 21 | 7 | 3 | 0 | 0 | 0 | 24 | 7 |
| Rubin Kazan | 2015–16 | Russian Premier League | 22 | 5 | 0 | 0 | 6 | 2 | 28 | 7 |
| Rubin Kazan | 2016–17 | Russian Premier League | 9 | 0 | 3 | 0 | 0 | 0 | 12 | 0 |
| Rubin Kazan | 2017–18 | Russian Premier League | 21 | 2 | 0 | 0 | 0 | 0 | 21 | 2 |
| Rubin Kazan | Total | | 226 | 39 | 13 | 3 | 59 | 10 | 298 | 52 |
| Career totals | | | 472 | 103 | 44 | 16 | 61 | 10 | 577 | 129 |

=== International goals ===
| # | Date | Venue | Opponent | Score | Result | Competition |
|---|---|---|---|---|---|---|
| 1. | 11 June 2003 | BJK İnönü Stadium, Istanbul, Turkey | North Macedonia | 2–2 | 3–2 | UEFA Euro 2004 qualifying |
| 2. | 23 June 2003 | Saint-Étienne, France | Brazil | 1–1 | 2–2 | 2003 FIFA Confederations Cup |
| 3. | 26 June 2003 | Paris, France | France | 2–1 | 3–2 | 2003 FIFA Confederations Cup |
| 4. | 28 April 2004 | King Baudouin Stadium, Brussels, Belgium | Belgium | 3–2 | 3–2 | Friendly |
| 5. | 9 October 2004 | Şükrü Saracoğlu Stadium, Istanbul, Turkey | Kazakhstan | 1–0 | 4–0 | 2006 FIFA World Cup qual. |
| 6. | 24 March 2007 | Piraeus, Greece | Greece | 1–1 | 1–4 | UEFA Euro 2008 qualifying |

== Trivia ==
- One of the sectors of the Ak Bars Arena in Kazan has been named in honor of Gökdeniz Karadeniz. The name was chosen based on a vote by the club's fans.

== Honours ==
Trabzonspor

- Turkish Cup: (2): 2002–03, 2003–04

Rubin Kazan

- Russian Premier League: (2): 2008, 2009
- Russian Cup: 2011–12
- Russian Super Cup: (2) 2010, 2012
- Commonwealth of Independent States Cup: 2010
- Marbella Cup: 2012

Turkey

- FIFA Confederations Cup: 3rd place (1): 2003
- UEFA European Championship: 3rd place (1): 2008
