= Inal Getigezhev =

Russian footballer

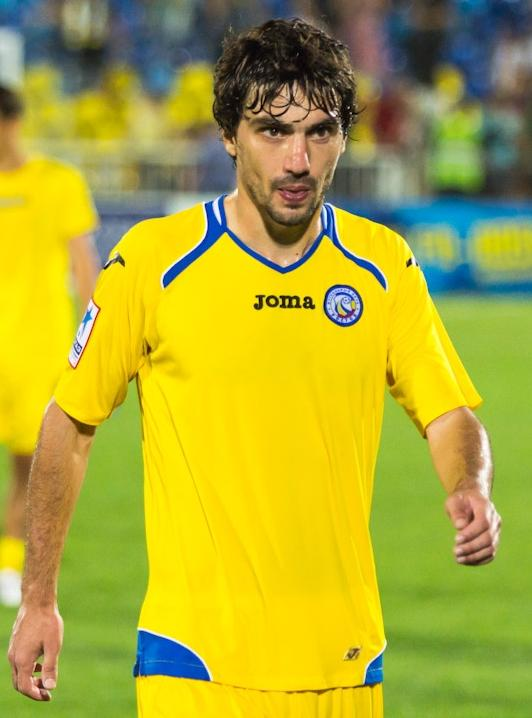
- With FC Rostov in 2012

Personal information
- Full name: Inal Arsenovich Getigezhev
- Date of birth: 23 May 1987 (age 39)
- Place of birth: Rostov-on-Don, Russia, Soviet Union
- Height: 1.87 m (6 ft 1 1/2 in)
- Positions: Left back; left midfielder

Youth career
- Lokomotiv Moscow

Senior career*
Years	Team	Apps	(Gls)
2005–2008	Lokomotiv Moscow	1	(0)
2008	→ Rostov (loan)	3	(0)
2008	→ Torpedo Moscow (loan)	18	(1)
2009	Nizhny Novgorod	34	(1)
2010–2012	Volga Nizhny Novgorod	62	(0)
2012–2013	Rostov	30	(0)
2013–2017	Rubin Kazan	7	(0)
2016	→ Gazovik Orenburg (loan)	1	(0)
2017	Orenburg	7	(0)
2018	Torpedo-BelAZ Zhodino	2	(0)

International career^{‡}
2011–2012	Russia-2	3	(0)
- * Club domestic league appearances and goals as of 19 June 2018 ‡ National team caps and goals as of 9 September 2012

Inal Arsenovich Getigezhev (Russian: Инал Арсенович Гетигежев; born 23 May 1987) is a Russian former professional footballer. In 2018 he played for Torpedo-BelAZ Zhodino.

== Club career ==
He made his debut in the Russian Premier League in 2006 for FC Lokomotiv Moscow.

== Honours ==
- Russian Premier League bronze: 2006
