= Central Stadium (Kazan) =

Sports venue in Kazan, Russia

Central Stadium of Kazan
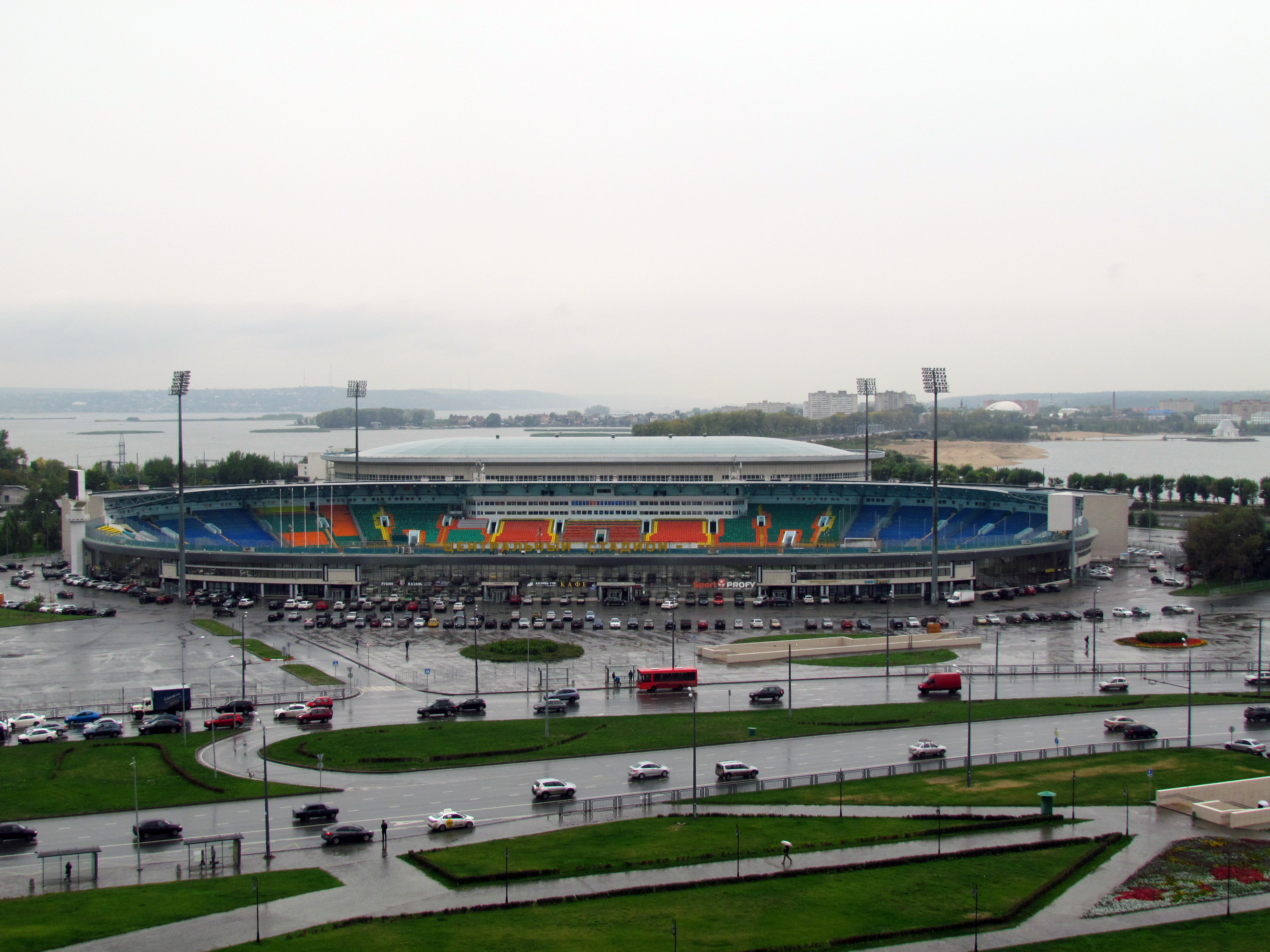
- Interactive map of Central Stadium of Kazan
- Location: Kazan, Russia
- Coordinates: 55°47′49″N 49°5′56″E
- Owner: City of Kazan
- Capacity: 24,200
- Surface: Grass

Construction
- Opened: 1960
- Architect: V. Portyankin

Tenant
- FC Rubin Kazan

The Central Stadium (Russian: Центральный стадион, Tatar: Үзәк стадион, romanized: Uzäk Stadion) is a multi-purpose stadium in Kazan, Russia. It is one of the first sports facilities constructed in Kazan. It is currently used mostly for football matches and is the home ground of FC Rubin Kazan. The western half of the tribunes is covered with a canopy. In 2010, the stadium gained Four stars classification from UEFA. In 2013, the stadium provided the stage for the track and field tournament as part of the 27th Summer Universiade. In September of the same year, the venue played host to the 2014 FIFA World Cup qualifier – Russia vs Luxembourg, in which Russia won the match 4-1.

== Main characteristics ==
- Field size 110x73 m, marked out - 105x68 m
- Motomatic grass surface
- Two training halls
- Children's gymnastics hall
- Aerobics halls
