= 2019 FC Atyrau season =

Atyrau
2019 season
- Chairman: Zheksenbai Kusainov
- Manager: Viktor Kumykov (until 27 April); Kuanysh Kuandulov (Caretaker) (from 27 April-3 May); Oleg Dulub (from 3 May)
- Stadium: Munaishy Stadium
- Premier League: 11th
- Kazakhstan Cup: Runners Up
- Top goalscorer: League: Islamnur Abdulavov (5); All: Two Players (5)
Home colours	Away colours

The 2019 FC Atyrau season was the 19th successive season that the club played in the Kazakhstan Premier League, the highest tier of association football in Kazakhstan. They reached the Kazakhstan Cup Final for the third year in succession, losing to FC Kaisar, whilst finishing 11th in the Kazakhstan Premier League, being relegated for the first time.

== Season events ==
On 27 April, Viktor Kumykov left his role as manager of Atyrau by mutual consent, with Kuanysh Kuandulov being appointed as caretaker manager. Oleg Dulub was appointed as the club's permanent manager on 3 May.

== Squad ==
As of match played 10 November 2019

No.	Name	Nationality	Position	Date of birth (age)	Signed from	Signed in	Contract ends	Apps.	Goals
Goalkeepers
12	Nurbolat Kalmenov	(Kazakhstan)	GK	15 September 1990 (age 36)	Caspiy	2019		5	0
31	Mikhail Golubnichy	(Kazakhstan)	GK	31 January 1995 (age 31)	Aksu	2019		0	0
33	Antun Marković	(Croatia)	GK	4 July 1992 (age 34)	Slaven Belupo	2019		11	0
Defenders|-
2	Dauren Mazhitov	(Kazakhstan)	DF	3 March 1996 (age 30)	Youth Team	2014		39	1
3	Adilbek Zhumakhanov	(Kazakhstan)	DF	27 December 2002 (age 23)	Youth Team	2019		1	0
4	Mikhail Gabyshev	(Kazakhstan)	DF	2 January 1990 (age 36)	Caspiy	2019		10	0
5	Rizvan Ablitarov	(Ukraine)	DF	18 April 1989 (age 37)	Chornomorets Odesa	2017		83	5
27	Andrey Shabaev	(Kazakhstan)	DF	15 February 1987 (age 39)	Kyzylzhar	2019		34	0
29	Sultan Kabdrakhimov	(Kazakhstan)	DF	5 November 1997 (age 29)	Youth Team	2019		1	0
49	Vitali Ustinov	(Russia)	DF	3 May 1991 (age 35)	Rubin Kazan	2019		6	0
75	Kuanysh Yeltezerov	(Kazakhstan)	DF	22 September 1995 (age 31)	Aktobe	2017			
Midfielders
6	Boubacar Mansaly	(Senegal)	MF	4 February 1988 (age 38)	Salam Zgharta	2019		8	0
8	Dauren Kayralliyev	(Kazakhstan)	MF	15 May 1992 (age 34)	Caspiy	2017		50	1
9	Alexey Rodionov	(Kazakhstan)	MF	29 March 1994 (age 32)	Astana	2018		48	4
11	Alex Bruno	(Brazil)	MF	7 October 1993 (age 33)	Londrina	2019		12	0
18	Kuanysh Kalmuratov	(Kazakhstan)	MF	27 August 1996 (age 30)	Youth Team	2015		106	3
19	Aybolat Makuov	(Kazakhstan)	MF	16 February 1997 (age 29)	Olé Brasil	2015		16	0
21	Jacques Alberto Ngwem	(Cameroon)	MF	3 August 1992 (age 34)	Volos	2019		12	0
40	Sanzhar Satanov	(Kazakhstan)	MF	21 September 2001 (age 25)	Youth Team	2019		1	0
74	Rinat Dzhumatov	(Kazakhstan)	MF	13 October 1997 (age 29)	Youth team	2018		39	2
77	Eldar Abdrakhmanov	(Kazakhstan)	MF	16 January 1987 (age 39)	Akzhayik	2017		68	5
83	Eduard Sergienko	(Kazakhstan)	MF	18 February 1983 (age 43)	Akzhayik	2017		75	2
88	Rafail Ospanov	(Kazakhstan)	MF	5 November 1997 (age 29)	Youth Team	2016		28	0
96	Ivan Antipov	(Kazakhstan)	MF	14 January 1996 (age 30)	Zhetysu	2019		11	1
Forwards
10	Piotr Grzelczak	(Poland)	FW	2 March 1988 (age 38)	Chojniczanka Chojnice	2019		9	5
99	Islamnur Abdulavov	(Russia)	FW	7 March 1994 (age 32)	Tom Tomsk	2019		14	5
Players away on loan
Left during the season
1	Vladimir Loginovsky	(Kazakhstan)	GK	8 October 1985 (age 41)	Taraz	2018		39	0
4	Ivica Žunić	(Croatia)	DF	11 September 1988 (age 38)	Chornomorets Odesa	2019		21	2
6	Željko Filipović	(Slovenia)	MF	3 October 1988 (age 38)	Dynamo Brest	2019		9	0
7	František Kubík	(Slovakia)	DF	14 March 1989 (age 37)	Žilina	2018		19	3
10	Josip Ivančić	(Croatia)	FW	29 March 1991 (age 35)	Ashdod	2019		8	1
10	Malick Mané	(Senegal)	FW	14 October 1988 (age 38)	Laçi	2019		4	0
11	Vladimir Vomenko	(Kazakhstan)	MF	22 May 1995 (age 31)	Irtysh Pavlodar	2019		12	1
13	Aibar Nurybekov	(Kazakhstan)	FW	29 August 1992 (age 34)	Shakhter Karagandy	2017		100	6
16	Aleksandr Zarutskiy	(Kazakhstan)	GK	26 August 1993 (age 33)	Kubanskaya Korona Shevchenko	2019		3	0
23	Andriy Tkachuk	(Ukraine)	MF	18 November 1987 (age 38)	Akzhayik	2019		20	0
31	Darko Bjedov	(Serbia)	FW	28 March 1989 (age 37)	Vojvodina	2019		18	2
33	Serhiy Zahynaylov	(Ukraine)	MF	3 January 1991 (age 35)	Sumy	2019		16	0
	Sebastijan Antić	(Croatia)	DF	5 November 1991 (age 35)	Al-Quwa Al-Jawiya	2019		0	0

== Transfers ==
=== In ===
Date	Position	Nationality	Name	From	Fee	Ref.
Winter 2019	GK	(Kazakhstan)	Nurbolat Kalmenov	Caspiy	Undisclosed	
Winter 2019	GK	(Kazakhstan)	Aleksandr Zarutskiy	Kubanskaya Korona Shevchenko	Undisclosed	
Winter 2019	MF	(Kazakhstan)	Vladimir Vomenko	Irtysh Pavlodar	Undisclosed	
Winter 2019	MF	(Ukraine)	Andriy Tkachuk	Akzhayik	Undisclosed	
Winter 2019	MF	(Ukraine)	Serhiy Zahynaylov	Sumy	Undisclosed	
13 January 2019	FW	(Serbia)	Darko Bjedov	Vojvodina	Undisclosed	
15 January 2019	DF	(Kazakhstan)	Andrey Shabaev	Kyzylzhar	Undisclosed	
16 January 2019	FW	(Croatia)	Josip Ivančić	Ashdod	Undisclosed	
6 February 2019	MF	(Slovenia)	Željko Filipović	Dynamo Brest	Undisclosed	
7 February 2019	DF	(Croatia)	Ivica Žunić	Chornomorets Odesa	Undisclosed	
28 June 2019	MF	(Senegal)	Boubacar Mansaly	Salam Zgharta	Undisclosed	
3 July 2019	FW	(Russia)	Islamnur Abdulavov	Tom Tomsk	Undisclosed	
3 July 2019	FW	(Senegal)	Malick Mané	Laçi	Undisclosed	
19 July 2019	GK	(Croatia)	Antun Marković	Slaven Belupo	Undisclosed	
19 July 2019	GK	(Kazakhstan)	Mikhail Golubnichy	Aksu	Undisclosed	
19 July 2019	DF	(Kazakhstan)	Mikhail Gabyshev	Caspiy	Undisclosed	
19 July 2019	MF	(Kazakhstan)	Ivan Antipov	Zhetysu	Undisclosed	
7 August 2019	DF	(Croatia)	Sebastijan Antić	Al-Quwa Al-Jawiya	Undisclosed	
23 August 2019	DF	(Russia)	Vitali Ustinov	Rubin Kazan	Free	
23 August 2019	FW	(Poland)	Piotr Grzelczak	Chojniczanka Chojnice	Free	
Summer 2019	MF	(Brazil)	Alex Bruno	Londrina	Undisclosed	
Summer 2019	MF	(Cameroon)	Jacques Alberto Ngwem	Volos	Undisclosed	

=== Released ===
Date	Position	Nationality	Name	Joined	Date	Ref.
May 2019	MF	(Slovenia)	Željko Filipović			
20 June 2019	DF	(Slovakia)	František Kubík			
1 July 2019	GK	(Kazakhstan)	Aleksandr Zarutskiy	Irtysh Pavlodar		
1 July 2019	MF	(Ukraine)	Serhiy Zahynaylov			
1 July 2019	FW	(Croatia)	Josip Ivančić			
1 July 2019	FW	(Serbia)	Darko Bjedov			
2 July 2019	FW	(Kazakhstan)	Aibar Nurybekov			
18 July 2019	DF	(Croatia)	Ivica Žunić	Gabala	19 July 2019	
18 July 2019	MF	(Ukraine)	Andriy Tkachuk	Chornomorets Odesa		
Summer 2019	GK	(Kazakhstan)	Vladimir Loginovsky	Atyrau	January 2020	
Summer 2019	DF	(Croatia)	Sebastijan Antić	Orijent 1919		
Summer 2019	MF	(Kazakhstan)	Vladimir Vomenko			
16 August 2019	FW	(Senegal)	Malick Mané			

== Competitions ==
=== Premier League ===
==== Results summary ====
Overall								Home						Away					
Pld	W	D	L	GF	GA	GD	Pts	W	D	L	GF	GA	GD	W	D	L	GF	GA	GD
33	6	8	19	25	58	−33	26	3	4	9	14	31	−17	3	4	10	11	27	−16

Last updated: 10 November 2019.
Source: See Results

==== Results by round ====
Round	1	2	3	4	5	6	7	8	9	10	11	12	13	14	15	16	17	18	19	20	21	22	23	24	25	26	27	28	29	30	31	32	33
Ground	A	H	A	A	H	A	H	A	A	H	A	H	A	A	H	A	H	A	H	H	H	A	A	H	A	A	H	A	H	A	A	H	A
Result	W	L	L	L	D	L	L	L	D	L	D	W	L	L	D	D	D	L	W	W	L	L	L	L	L	D	L	D	L	W	W	L	L
Position	6	7	9	9	9	9	11	11	11	11	10	11	11	11	11	11	10	10	9	9	10	10	11	11	11	11	11	11	11	11	11	11	11

Source: See Results
A = Away; H = Home; W = Win; D = Draw; L = Loss

==== Results ====
10 March 2019 1	Kaisar	0 – 1	Atyrau	Kyzylorda
16:00 (UTC+6)	John (yellow card) 6'; Punoševac (yellow card) 42'; Marochkin (yellow card) 90+3'	Report	D.Mazhitov 2'; A.Shabaev (yellow card) 19'; K.Kalmuratov (yellow card) 58'; Tkachuk (yellow card) 82'; Sergienko (red card) 90+2'	Stadium: Gani Muratbayev Stadium; Attendance: 4,000; Referee: Denis Izmailov

15 March 2019 2	Atyrau	1 – 3	Irtysh Pavlodar	Astana
15:00 (UTC+6)	Žunić 30'; Kubík (yellow card) 53'	Report	Fonseca 20'; Cañas 33'; Darabayev 41'	Stadium: Astana Arena; Attendance: 600; Referee: Ruslan Omarov
Note: Match played at the Astana Arena instead of Atyrau's regular home ground, Munaishy Stadium.

30 March 2019 3	Taraz	2 – 0	Atyrau	Taraz
16:00 (UTC+6)	Lobjanidze 70'; Nyuiadzi 77'	Report	D.Mazhitov (yellow card) 29'; Kubík (yellow card) 45+1'	Stadium: Central Stadium; Attendance: 5,000; Referee: Arman Ismuratov

3 April 2019 18	Astana	3 – 1	Atyrau	Astana
19:00 (UTC+6)	Kabananga 17'; Rotariu 40'; Beisebekov 49'; Aničić (yellow card) 82'	Report	K.Kalmuratov (yellow card) 47'; D.Kayralliyev (yellow card) 54'; Tkachuk (yellow card) 81'; R.Dzhumatov 85'	Stadium: Astana Arena; Attendance: 2,100; Referee: Aydin Rakhimbayev

7 April 2019 4	Atyrau	0 – 0	Shakhter Karagandy	Astana
17:00 (UTC+6)	R.Dzhumatov (yellow card) 68'; Kubík (yellow card) 90'	Report	Kizito (yellow card) 89'	Stadium: Astana Arena; Attendance: 500; Referee: Denis Izmailov
Note: Match played at the Astana Arena instead of Atyrau's regular home ground, Munaishy Stadium.

14 April 2019 5	Aktobe	2 – 0	Atyrau	Kostanay
15:00 (UTC+6)	Radin 3'; Marjanović (yellow card) 21'; Miličević 45'; A.Tanzharikov (yellow card) 78'	Report	Kubík (yellow card) 2'; Ablitarov 67'	Stadium: Central Stadium; Attendance: 200; Referee: Sergey Gorokhovodatskiy
Note: Match played at the Central Stadium in Kostanay instead of Aktobe's regular Central Stadium in Aktobe.

20 April 2019 6	Atyrau	1 – 2	Okzhetpes	Shymkent
17:00 (UTC+6)	Žunić (yellow card) 45'; Ivančić 65'; Loginovsky (yellow card) 77'	Report	Stojanović 5'; Kasmynin (yellow card) 18'; Nusserbayev 33'; Moldakaraev (yellow card) 42'; Dmitrijev (yellow card) 77'	Stadium: Namys Stadion; Attendance: 250; Referee: Denis Tevyashov

24 April 2019 20	Kairat	2 – 0	Atyrau	Almaty
19:00 (UTC+6)	Eppel 17', 90'; Han (yellow card) 45+1'; Suyumbayev (yellow card) 63'; Dugalić (yellow card) 90+4'	Report	Filipović (yellow card) 39'; A.Nurybekov (yellow card) 45+1' (yellow-red card) 77'; Ablitarov (yellow card) 47'; D.Mazhitov (yellow card) 52'	Stadium: Central Stadium; Attendance: 2,500; Referee: Arman Ismuratov

27 April 2019 7	Zhetysu	0 – 0	Atyrau	Taldıqorğan
17:00 (UTC+6)	Mukhutdinov (yellow card) 6'; E.Altynbekov (yellow card) 53'	Report	Ablitarov (yellow card) 53'; A.Shabaev (yellow card) 90+2'; V.Vomenko (yellow card) 90+4'	Stadium: Zhetysu Stadium; Attendance: 3,000; Referee: Aleksandr Gauzer

1 May 2019 8	Atyrau	0 – 3	Astana	Atyrau
17:30 (UTC+6)	K.Kalmuratov (yellow card) 16'	Report	Tomasov 7' (yellow card) 14'; Muzhikov 59'; Khizhnichenko 90+2'	Stadium: Munaishy Stadium; Attendance: 500; Referee: Rustam Omarov

5 May 2019 9	Ordabasy	1 – 1	Atyrau	Shymkent
17:00 (UTC+6)	Fontanello 54'	Report	D.Kayralliyev (yellow card) 37'; V.Vomenko 71'; R.Ospanov (yellow card) 76'	Stadium: Kazhymukan Munaitpasov Stadium; Attendance: 2,500; Referee: Georgiy Chekhovskiy

12 May 2019 10	Atyrau	2 – 1	Kairat	Nur-Sultan
19:00 (UTC+6)	Žunić 35' (pen.); Ablitarov 69'; Loginovsky (yellow card) 90+2'	Report	Dugalić (yellow card) 34'; Eseola 36'; Abiken (yellow card) 65'	Stadium: Astana Arena; Attendance: 500; Referee: Saken Bayimbet

18 May 2019 11	Tobol	3 – 0	Atyrau	Kostanay
17:00 (UTC+6)	Fedin 44'; Žulpa 53'; Nurgaliev (yellow card) 59'; Kankava (yellow card) 66'; Dmitrenko (yellow card) 74'; S.Zharynbetov (yellow card) 75'; Valiullin 90+3'	Report	A.Shabaev (yellow card) 74'; D.Mazhitov (yellow card) 75'; R.Ospanov (yellow card) 90+1'	Stadium: Central Stadium; Attendance: 3,000; Referee: Bolat Karlibayev

26 May 2019 12	Irtysh Pavlodar	1 – 0	Atyrau	Pavlodar
18:00 (UTC+6)	Cañas (yellow card) 46'; R.Aslan (yellow card) 59' (goal) 75'; Fonseca (yellow card) 73'	Report	Zahynaylov (yellow card) 34'; Bjedov (yellow card) 63'; Loginovsky (yellow card) 90'; A.Rodionov (yellow card) 90+4'	Stadium: Central Stadium; Attendance: 3,000; Referee: Zhandos Abzhan

31 May 2019 13	Atyrau	1 – 1	Taraz	Kokshetau
15:00 (UTC+6)	Bjedov 81'; A.Shabaev (yellow card) 84'; A.Rodionov (yellow card) 89'	Report	Lobjanidze 66' (pen.); A.Taubay (yellow card) 90+4'	Stadium: Okzhetpes Stadium; Attendance: 200; Referee: Sergey Nozhenko

16 June 2019 14	Shakhter Karagandy	1 – 1	Atyrau	Karaganda
19:00 (UTC+6)	Shkodra 22' (yellow card) 69'	Report	A.Makuov (yellow card) 58'; Tkachuk (yellow card) 61'; Bjedov 64'; A.Rodionov (yellow card) 83'	Stadium: Shakhter Stadium; Attendance: 5,500; Referee: Denis Tevyashov

23 June 2019 15	Atyrau	1 – 1	Aktobe	Atyrau
20:00 (UTC+6)	A.Makuov (yellow card) 39'; K.Kalmuratov 44'	Report	A.Saulet 18'; I.Trofimets (yellow card) 90+1'; Kukeyev (yellow card) 90+3'	Stadium: Munaishy Stadium; Attendance: 4,500; Referee: Aleksandr Zatula

30 June 2019 16	Okzhetpes	3 – 0	Atyrau	Kokshetau
17:00 (UTC+6)	N.Dairov (yellow card) 15'; Nusserbayev 45+2' (pen.); Alves 62'; Zorić (yellow card) 70'; S.Zhumakhanov 86'	Report		Stadium: Okzhetpes Stadium; Attendance: 2,500; Referee: Denis Izmailov

6 July 2019 17	Atyrau	2 – 1	Zhetysu	Atyrau
20:00 (UTC+6)	Abdulavov 31'; A.Rodionov 63' (yellow card) 74'	Report	Darabayev 61' (yellow card) 90'; Mawutor (yellow card) 74'; Naumov (yellow card) 79'; Kuklys (yellow card) 90'	Stadium: Munaishy Stadium; Attendance: 4,500; Referee: Ruslan Omarov

21 July 2019 19	Atyrau	1 – 0	Ordabasy	Atyrau
20:00 (UTC+6)	M.Gabyshev (yellow card) 31'; I.Antipov (yellow card) 60'; Abdulavov 74'; Mansaly (yellow card) 83'	Report	Korobkin (yellow card) 22'; João Paulo (yellow card) 87'	Stadium: Munaishy Stadium; Attendance: 4,500; Referee: Aleksandr Gauzer

4 August 2019 21	Atyrau	0 – 1	Tobol	Atyrau
20:00 (UTC+6)	Ablitarov (yellow card) 46'; D.Mazhitov (yellow card) 82'; Sergienko (yellow card) 90'	Report	Sebai 38' (yellow card) 66'; Kankava (yellow card) 54'; Turysbek (yellow card) 62'	Stadium: Munaishy Stadium; Attendance: 4,500; Referee: Timur Kumashev

10 August 2019 22	Atyrau	1 – 3	Kaisar	Atyrau
20:00 (UTC+6)	I.Antipov 37'; A.Makuov (yellow card) 39'; M.Gabyshev (yellow card) 52'	Report	Barseghyan 31', 45', 53'; Graf (yellow card) 65'; Gorman (yellow card) 83'	Stadium: Munaishy Stadium; Attendance: 4,000; Referee: Aydin Rakhimbayev

24 August 2019 24	Tobol	2 – 0	Atyrau	Kostanay
19:00 (UTC+6)	Abilgazy 32' (yellow card) 60'; Kankava (yellow card) 40'; Miroshnichenko 71'	Report	Ngwem (yellow card) 22'; R.Ospanov (yellow card) 25'; Ustinov (yellow card) 65'; M.Gabyshev (yellow card) 80'	Stadium: Central Stadium; Attendance: 4,500; Referee: Sergey Nozhenko

31 August 2019 25	Atyrau	0 – 3	Irtysh Pavlodar	Atyrau
19:30 (UTC+6)	Ustinov (red card) 19'; A.Rodionov (yellow card) 78'	Report	Stanojević 5' (yellow card) 50'; D.Shmidt (yellow card) 22'; T.Muldinov (yellow card) 26'; Vitas (yellow card) 75'; Manzorro 90+2'; Hidi 90+4'	Stadium: Munaishy Stadium; Attendance: 3,500; Referee: Ruslan Omarov

15 September 2019 26	Aktobe	3 – 2	Atyrau	Aktobe
19:00 (UTC+6)	Aimbetov 23' (pen.); Pizzelli 65'; A.Kakimov 90+1'	Report	M.Gabyshev (yellow card) 22'; Sergienko 37'; Abdulavov 45+1' (yellow card) 50'; A.Rodionov (yellow card) 90+1'	Stadium: Central Stadium; Attendance: 10,000; Referee: Anatolyi Vishnichenko

21 September 2019 27	Taraz	2 – 2	Atyrau	Taraz
18:00 (UTC+6)	Kozhamberdi (yellow card) 16'; M.Amirkhanov (yellow card) 49'; A.Suley 80'; R.Rozybakiev (yellow card) 81'; Lobjanidze 90+4'	Report	Ablitarov (yellow card) 56' (goal) 85'; Abdulavov 61'	Stadium: Central Stadium; Attendance: 2,800; Referee: Aleksandr Zatula

25 September 2019 23	Atyrau	1 – 4	Astana	Atyrau
16:00 (UTC+6)	K.Kalmuratov (yellow card) 73' (goal) 89'	Report	Marković 13' (o.g.); Tomasov 15', 33'; Rotariu 45+2'	Stadium: Munaishy Stadium; Attendance: 2,000; Referee: Denis Izmailov
Note: Match originally scheduled for 17 August 2019 but postponed due to Astana's involvement in UEFA Europa League qualifiers.

29 September 2019 28	Atyrau	2 – 2	Okzhetpes	Atyrau
16:00 (UTC+6)	Ustinov (red card) 4'; Abdulavov 31'; Grzelczak 35'	Report	Alves 27' (yellow card) 55'; Dimov (yellow card) 53'; Stojanović 66'	Stadium: Munaishy Stadium; Attendance: 2,000; Referee: Zhandos Abzhan

19 October 2019 30	Atyrau	0 – 3	Zhetysu	Atyrau
16:00 (UTC+6)	A.Shabaev (yellow card) 27'; E.Abdrakhmanov (yellow card) 90+5'	Report	Toshev 11'; Stepanyuk 38'; Adamović 40'	Stadium: Munaishy Stadium; Attendance: 2,000; Referee: Anatolyi Vishnichenko

25 October 2019 31	Kaisar	0 – 1	Atyrau	Kyzylorda
16:00 (UTC+6)	Barseghyan (yellow card) 21'; Bitang (yellow card) 49'; Gorman (yellow card) 62'; Mbombo (yellow card) 87'; Lamanje (yellow card) 90'	Report	E.Abdrakhmanov (yellow card) 5'; Ablitarov (yellow card) 28'; Grzelczak 39'	Stadium: Gani Muratbayev Stadium; Attendance: 1,500; Referee: Arman Ismuratov

30 October 2019 29	Shakhter Karagandy	0 – 1	Atyrau	Nur-Sultan
19:00 (UTC+6)	Nurgaliyev (yellow card) 82'; Baytana (yellow card) 90'; Vidović (red card) 90+2'	Report	Grzelczak 20'; E.Abdrakhmanov (yellow card) 87'; A.Rodionov (yellow card) 88'; Ngwem (red card) 90'	Stadium: Astana Arena; Attendance: 1,000; Referee: Georgiy Chekhovskiy
Note: Match originally scheduled for 4 October 2019 but postponed due to Atyrau's involvement in 2019 Kazakhstan Cup Final on 6 October 2019. Match played at the Astana Arena instead of Shakhter's regular home ground, Shakhter Stadium.

3 November 2019 32	Atyrau	1 – 3	Ordabasy	Atyrau
15:00 (UTC+6)	Grzelczak 12'; Alex Bruno (red card) 73'	Report	João Paulo 42'; Dosmagambetov (yellow card) 52'; Zhangylyshbay (yellow card) 73'; Shchotkin 87'; Badibanga 90+2'	Stadium: Munaishy Stadium; Attendance: 2,000; Referee: Aydin Rakhimbayev

10 November 2019 33	Kairat	2 – 1	Atyrau	Almaty
15:00 (UTC+6)	Zhukov 18'; Eseola 70'; Mikanović (yellow card) 80'; R.Orazov (yellow card) 85'	Report	E.Abdrakhmanov (yellow card) 31'; Grzelczak (yellow card) 33'; Dugalić 76' (o.g.)	Stadium: Central Stadium; Attendance: 2,500; Referee: Denis Tevyashov

==== League table ====
Pos	Team	Pld	W	D	L	GF	GA	GD	Pts	Qualification or relegation
8	Irtysh Pavlodar	33	11	4	18	30	45	−15	37	
9	Shakhter Karagandy	33	9	8	16	40	47	−7	35	
10	Taraz (O)	33	7	8	18	28	60	−32	29	Qualification for the relegation play-offs
11	Atyrau (R)	33	6	8	19	25	58	−33	26	Relegation to the Kazakhstan First Division
12	Aktobe (Note: Aktobe had six points deducted on 18 February 2019 as a punishment for unpaid debts to former player Dele Adeleye. On 14 March 2019, Aktobe were handed a further six point deduction for unpaid debts to former player Nemanja Nikolić.) (R)	33	7	6	20	35	75	−40	15	Relegation to the Kazakhstan First Division

Source: UEFA, Soccerway
Rules for classification: 1) Points; 2) Goal difference; 3) Matches won; 4) Goals scored; 5) Away goals scored; 6) Head-to-head points; 7) Head-to-head matches won; 8) Head-to-head goal difference; 9) Head-to-head goals scored; 10) Head-to-head away goals scored; 11) Draw.
(O) Play-off winners; (R) Relegated

=== Kazakhstan Cup ===
10 April 2019 Last 16	Atyrau	1 – 0	Zhetysu	Astana
19:00 (UTC+6)	Bjedov (yellow card) 26'; Kubík (yellow card) 54'; A.Rodionov 78'	Report	Mawutor (red card) 41'	Stadium: Astana Arena; Attendance: 500; Referee: Aleksandr Zatula
Note: Match played at Astana's Astana Arena in Astana, instead of Atyrau's regular Munaishy Stadium in Atyrau.

8 May 2019 Quarterfinal	Altai Semey	1 – 1 (a.e.t.) (1 – 3 p)	Atyrau	Semey
15:00 (UTC+6)	V.Vyatkin 49'; M.Damir (yellow card) 57' (yellow-red card) 99'; A.Shakin (yellow card) 102'	Report	R.Dzhumatov 12'; E.Abdrakhmanov (yellow card) 45+1'; Sergienko (yellow card) 64'; Ivančić (yellow card) 119'	Stadium: Spartak Stadium; Attendance: 3,000; Referee: Daniyar Sahi
	Penalties
	A.Umashev (penalty scored); V.Vyatkin (penalty missed); C.Bernatsky (penalty missed); A.Sapargaliev (penalty missed)		Sergienko (penalty missed); A.Shabaev (penalty scored); Ivančić (penalty scored); Tkachuk (penalty missed); K.Kalmuratov (penalty scored)

22 May 2019 Semifinal 1st leg	Ordabasy	1 – 1	Atyrau	Shymkent
18:00 (UTC+6)	Diakate 17' (pen.); Fontanello (yellow card) 28'; D.Dautov (yellow card) 90+2'	Report	R.Ospanov (yellow card) 45+1'; Sergienko 67'; A.Shabaev (yellow card) 88'; V.Vomenko (yellow card) 90+3'	Stadium: Kazhymukan Munaitpasov Stadium; Attendance: 3,000; Referee: Bakhyt Kyzylbaev

19 June 2019 Semifinal 2nd leg	Atyrau	0 – 0 (a 1 – 1 agg.)	Ordabasy	Atyrau
15:00 (UTC+6)	D.Mazhitov (yellow card) 70'; Loginovsky (yellow card) 90+5'	Report	Nepohodov (yellow card) 82'	Stadium: Munaishy Stadium; Attendance: 6,000; Referee: Bagdat Abdullayev

==== Final ====
6 October 2019	Atyrau	1 – 2 (a.e.t.)	Kaisar	Nur-Sultan
15:00 (UTC+6)	E.Abdrakhmanov (yellow card) 53'; Grzelczak 67'; Ngwem (yellow card) 68' (yellow-red card) 93'; N.Kalmenov (yellow card) 70'; A.Shabaev (yellow card) 105+1'; R.Dzhumatov (yellow card) 105+2'; I.Antipov (yellow card) 116'; K.Kalmuratov (yellow card) 120+5'	Report	John (yellow card) 4'; Tagybergen (red card) 70'; Barseghyan (yellow card) 70'; Marochkin (yellow card) 80'; Zyankovich 88'; Narzildaev 120+3'	Stadium: Astana Arena; Attendance: 4,500; Referee: Timur Kumashev

== Squad statistics ==
As of match played 10 November 2019

=== Appearances and goals ===
No.	Pos	Nat	Player	Total		Premier League		Kazakhstan Cup	
No.	Pos	Nat	Player	Apps	Goals	Apps	Goals	Apps	Goals
2	DF	(Kazakhstan) KAZ	Dauren Mazhitov	21	1	15+3	1	2+1	0
3	DF	(Kazakhstan) KAZ	Adilbek Zhumakhanov	1	0	1	0	0	0
4	DF	(Kazakhstan) KAZ	Mikhail Gabyshev	10	0	8+1	0	1	0
5	DF	(Ukraine) UKR	Rizvan Ablitarov	34	2	29+1	2	4	0
6	MF	(Senegal) SEN	Boubacar Mansaly	8	0	6+1	0	0+1	0
8	MF	(Kazakhstan) KAZ	Dauren Kayralliyev	9	0	3+5	0	1	0
9	FW	(Kazakhstan) KAZ	Alexey Rodionov	29	2	10+16	1	1+2	1
10	FW	(Poland) POL	Piotr Grzelczak	9	5	7+1	4	1	1
11	MF	(Brazil) BRA	Alex Bruno	12	0	8+3	0	1	0
12	GK	(Kazakhstan) KAZ	Nurbolat Kalmenov	5	0	5	0	0	0
18	MF	(Kazakhstan) KAZ	Kuanysh Kalmuratov	36	2	31	2	5	0
19	MF	(Kazakhstan) KAZ	Aybolat Makuov	16	0	10+2	0	1+3	0
21	MF	(Cameroon) CMR	Jacques Alberto Ngwem	12	0	11	0	1	0
27	DF	(Kazakhstan) KAZ	Andrey Shabaev	34	0	28+2	0	4	0
29	DF	(Kazakhstan) KAZ	Sultan Kabdrakhimov	1	0	0	0	0+1	0
33	GK	(Croatia) CRO	Antun Marković	11	0	10	0	1	0
40	MF	(Kazakhstan) KAZ	Sanzhar Satanov	1	0	0+1	0	0	0
49	DF	(Russia) RUS	Vitali Ustinov	6	0	5+1	0	0	0
74	MF	(Kazakhstan) KAZ	Rinat Dzhumatov	20	2	10+7	1	2+1	1
75	DF	(Kazakhstan) KAZ	Kuanysh Yeltezerov	1	0	0+1	0	0	0
77	DF	(Kazakhstan) KAZ	Eldar Abdrakhmanov	20	0	13+4	0	3	0
83	MF	(Kazakhstan) KAZ	Eduard Sergienko	31	2	23+4	1	3+1	1
88	MF	(Kazakhstan) KAZ	Rafail Ospanov	28	0	13+10	0	5	0
96	MF	(Kazakhstan) KAZ	Ivan Antipov	11	1	5+5	1	0+1	0
99	FW	(Russia) RUS	Islamnur Abdulavov	14	5	13	5	1	0
Players away from Atyrau on loan:
Players who left Atyrau during the season:
1	GK	(Kazakhstan) KAZ	Vladimir Loginovsky	19	0	16	0	3	0
4	DF	(Croatia) CRO	Ivica Žunić	21	2	18	2	3	0
6	MF	(Slovenia) SLO	Željko Filipović	9	0	8+1	0	0	0
7	DF	(Slovakia) SVK	František Kubík	10	0	7+1	0	1+1	0
10	FW	(Croatia) CRO	Josip Ivančić	9	1	4+3	1	1+1	0
10	FW	(Senegal) SEN	Malick Mané	4	0	4	0	0	0
11	MF	(Kazakhstan) KAZ	Vladimir Vomenko	12	1	3+6	1	2+1	0
13	FW	(Kazakhstan) KAZ	Aibar Nurybekov	3	0	2	0	0+1	0
16	GK	(Kazakhstan) KAZ	Aleksandr Zarutskiy	3	0	2	0	1	0
23	MF	(Ukraine) UKR	Andriy Tkachuk	20	0	15+2	0	3	0
31	FW	(Serbia) SRB	Darko Bjedov	18	2	11+3	2	3+1	0
33	MF	(Ukraine) UKR	Serhiy Zahynaylov	16	0	9+5	0	1+1	0

=== Goal scorers ===
Place	Position	Nation	Number	Name	Premier League	Kazakhstan Cup	Total
1	FW	(Russia)	99	Islamnur Abdulavov	5	0	5
1	FW	(Poland)	10	Piotr Grzelczak	4	1	5
3	DF	(Croatia)	4	Ivica Žunić	2	0	2
3	FW	(Serbia)	31	Darko Bjedov	2	0	2
3	DF	(Ukraine)	5	Rizvan Ablitarov	2	0	2
3	MF	(Kazakhstan)	18	Kuanysh Kalmuratov	2	0	2
3	MF	(Kazakhstan)	74	Rinat Dzhumatov	1	1	2
3	MF	(Kazakhstan)	9	Alexey Rodionov	1	1	2
3	MF	(Kazakhstan)	83	Eduard Sergienko	1	1	2
10	DF	(Kazakhstan)	2	Dauren Mazhitov	1	0	1
10	FW	(Croatia)	10	Josip Ivančić	1	0	1
10	MF	(Kazakhstan)	11	Vladimir Vomenko	1	0	1
10	MF	(Kazakhstan)	96	Ivan Antipov	1	0	1
				TOTALS	24	4	28

=== Disciplinary record ===
Number	Nation	Position	Name	Premier League		Kazakhstan Cup		Total	
Number	Nation	Position	Name	Yellow card	Red card	Yellow card	Red card	Yellow card	Red card
2	(Kazakhstan)	DF	Dauren Mazhitov	4	0	1	0	5	0
4	(Kazakhstan)	DF	Mikhail Gabyshev	4	0	0	0	4	0
5	(Ukraine)	DF	Rizvan Ablitarov	5	1	0	0	5	1
6	(Senegal)	MF	Boubacar Mansaly	1	0	0	0	1	0
8	(Kazakhstan)	MF	Dauren Kayralliyev	2	0	0	0	2	0
9	(Kazakhstan)	FW	Alexey Rodionov	7	0	0	0	7	0
10	(Poland)	FW	Piotr Grzelczak	1	0	0	0	1	0
11	(Brazil)	MF	Alex Bruno	0	1	0	0	0	1
12	(Kazakhstan)	GK	Nurbolat Kalmenov	0	0	1	0	1	0
18	(Kazakhstan)	MF	Kuanysh Kalmuratov	4	0	1	0	5	0
19	(Kazakhstan)	MF	Aybolat Makuov	3	0	0	0	3	0
21	(Cameroon)	MF	Jacques Alberto Ngwem	1	1	2	1	3	2
23	(Ukraine)	MF	Andriy Tkachuk	3	0	0	0	3	0
27	(Kazakhstan)	DF	Andrey Shabaev	5	0	2	0	7	0
49	(Russia)	DF	Vitali Ustinov	1	2	0	0	1	2
74	(Kazakhstan)	MF	Rinat Dzhumatov	1	0	1	0	2	0
77	(Kazakhstan)	DF	Eldar Abdrakhmanov	4	0	2	0	6	0
83	(Kazakhstan)	MF	Eduard Sergienko	1	1	1	0	2	1
88	(Kazakhstan)	MF	Rafail Ospanov	3	0	1	0	4	0
96	(Kazakhstan)	MF	Ivan Antipov	1	0	1	0	2	0
99	(Russia)	FW	Islamnur Abdulavov	1	0	0	0	1	0
Players who left Atyrau during the season:
1	(Kazakhstan)	GK	Vladimir Loginovsky	3	0	1	0	4	0
4	(Croatia)	DF	Ivica Žunić	1	0	0	0	1	0
6	(Slovenia)	MF	Željko Filipović	1	0	0	0	1	0
7	(Slovakia)	DF	František Kubík	4	0	1	0	5	0
10	(Croatia)	FW	Josip Ivančić	0	0	1	0	1	0
11	(Kazakhstan)	MF	Vladimir Vomenko	1	0	1	0	2	0
13	(Kazakhstan)	FW	Aibar Nurybekov	2	1	0	0	2	1
31	(Serbia)	FW	Darko Bjedov	1	0	1	0	2	0
33	(Ukraine)	MF	Serhiy Zahynaylov	1	0	0	0	1	0
			TOTALS	66	7	18	1	84	8
