= List of Kazakhstan football transfers summer 2019 =

This is a list of Kazakh football transfers that took place during the 2019 summer transfer window by club. Only clubs of the 2019 Kazakhstan Premier League are included. The summer transfer window ran from 26 June, to 24 July 2019.

== Kazakhstan Premier League 2019 ==
=== Aktobe ===
In: Note: Flags indicate national team as defined under FIFA eligibility rules; some limited exceptions apply. Players may hold more than one non-FIFA nationality.

No.	Pos.	Nation	Player
86	MF	UKR	Oleksandr Kitsak

Out: Note: Flags indicate national team as defined under FIFA eligibility rules; some limited exceptions apply. Players may hold more than one non-FIFA nationality.

No.	Pos.	Nation	Player
11	MF	SRB	Saša Marjanović (to (Cyprus) Nea Salamis Famagusta)
24	MF	SRB	Milan Radin
87	DF	SRB	Aleksandar Simčević (to (Kazakhstan) Taraz)

=== Astana ===
In: Note: Flags indicate national team as defined under FIFA eligibility rules; some limited exceptions apply. Players may hold more than one non-FIFA nationality.

No.	Pos.	Nation	Player
10	MF	ISL	Rúnar Már Sigurjónsson (from (Switzerland) Grasshoppers)
19	FW	COD	Ndombe Mubele (loan from (France) Toulouse)

Out: Note: Flags indicate national team as defined under FIFA eligibility rules; some limited exceptions apply. Players may hold more than one non-FIFA nationality.

No.	Pos.	Nation	Player
30	FW	COD	Junior Kabananga (loan return to (Saudi Arabia) Al-Nassr)
70	MF	KAZ	Sultan Sagnayev (loan to (Kazakhstan) Irtysh Pavlodar)

=== Atyrau ===
In: Note: Flags indicate national team as defined under FIFA eligibility rules; some limited exceptions apply. Players may hold more than one non-FIFA nationality.

No.	Pos.	Nation	Player
4	DF	KAZ	Mikhail Gabyshev (from (Kazakhstan) Caspiy)
6	MF	SEN	Boubacar Mansaly (from (Lebanon) Salam Zgharta)
10	FW	SEN	Malick Mané (from (Albania) Laçi)
31	GK	KAZ	Mikhail Golubnichy (from (Kazakhstan) Aksu)
33	GK	CRO	Antun Marković (from (Croatia) Slaven Belupo)
96	MF	KAZ	Ivan Antipov (from (Kazakhstan) Zhetysu)
99	FW	RUS	Islamnur Abdulavov (from (Russia) Tom Tomsk)

Out: Note: Flags indicate national team as defined under FIFA eligibility rules; some limited exceptions apply. Players may hold more than one non-FIFA nationality.

No.	Pos.	Nation	Player
4	DF	CRO	Ivica Žunić (to (Azerbaijan) Gabala)
6	MF	SVN	Željko Filipović
7	DF	SVK	František Kubík
10	FW	CRO	Josip Ivančić
13	FW	KAZ	Aibar Nurybekov
16	GK	KAZ	Aleksandr Zarutskiy
23	MF	UKR	Andriy Tkachuk (to (Ukraine) Chornomorets Odesa)
31	FW	SRB	Darko Bjedov
33	MF	UKR	Serhiy Zahynaylov

=== Irtysh Pavlodar ===
In: Note: Flags indicate national team as defined under FIFA eligibility rules; some limited exceptions apply. Players may hold more than one non-FIFA nationality.

No.	Pos.	Nation	Player
10	FW	SRB	Dejan Georgijević (from (Hungary) Ferencvárosi)
22	GK	KAZ	Andrey Pasechenko (on loan from (Kazakhstan) Tobol)
32	DF	SRB	Miloš Stamenković (from (Belgium) Union Saint-Gilloise)
50	FW	BRA	Reynaldo (from (Azerbaijan) Qarabağ)
66	MF	KAZ	Sultan Sagnayev (loan from (Kazakhstan) Astana)
77	DF	KAZ	Aleksandr Sokolenko (loan from (Kazakhstan) Kairat)
88	MF	SRB	Marko Stanojević (from (Greece) Levadiakos)
—	MF	TKM	Ruslan Mingazow (from (Czech Republic) Slavia Prague)

Out: Note: Flags indicate national team as defined under FIFA eligibility rules; some limited exceptions apply. Players may hold more than one non-FIFA nationality.

No.	Pos.	Nation	Player
4	DF	LVA	Kaspars Dubra
7	MF	KAZ	Pavel Shabalin (to (Kazakhstan) Taraz)
10	MF	KAZ	Aslan Darabayev (to (Kazakhstan) Zhetysu)
20	GK	KAZ	Anton Tsirin
21	FW	GAM	Momodou Ceesay
22	DF	KAZ	Bauyrzhan Tanirbergenov
50	FW	BRA	Reynaldo
66	MF	KAZ	Oybek Baltabaev
88	MF	COL	Roger Cañas
99	FW	SRB	Milan Mirosavljev

=== Kairat ===
In: Note: Flags indicate national team as defined under FIFA eligibility rules; some limited exceptions apply. Players may hold more than one non-FIFA nationality.

No.	Pos.	Nation	Player
10	FW	KAZ	Yerkebulan Seydakhmet (from (Russia) Ufa)

Out: Note: Flags indicate national team as defined under FIFA eligibility rules; some limited exceptions apply. Players may hold more than one non-FIFA nationality.

No.	Pos.	Nation	Player
3	DF	KAZ	Yan Vorogovskiy (to (Belgium) K Beerschot VA)
15	DF	KAZ	Aleksandr Sokolenko (loan to (Kazakhstan) Irtysh Pavlodar)
25	FW	KAZ	Samat Sarsenov (loan to (Kazakhstan) Taraz)
28	FW	KAZ	Rifat Nurmugamet (loan to (Kazakhstan) Zhetysu)

=== Kaisar ===
In: Note: Flags indicate national team as defined under FIFA eligibility rules; some limited exceptions apply. Players may hold more than one non-FIFA nationality.

No.	Pos.	Nation	Player
77	MF	COD	André Bukia (from (Portugal) Arouca)

Out: Note: Flags indicate national team as defined under FIFA eligibility rules; some limited exceptions apply. Players may hold more than one non-FIFA nationality.

No.	Pos.	Nation	Player
77	MF	POR	Carlitos

=== Okzhetpes ===
In: Note: Flags indicate national team as defined under FIFA eligibility rules; some limited exceptions apply. Players may hold more than one non-FIFA nationality.

No.	Pos.	Nation	Player
14	FW	LTU	Deimantas Petravičius (from (Scotland) Falkirk)
21	DF	BUL	Plamen Dimov (from (Bulgaria) Cherno More)

Out: Note: Flags indicate national team as defined under FIFA eligibility rules; some limited exceptions apply. Players may hold more than one non-FIFA nationality.

No.	Pos.	Nation	Player
21	DF	BLR	Uladzislaw Kasmynin

=== Ordabasy ===
In: Note: Flags indicate national team as defined under FIFA eligibility rules; some limited exceptions apply. Players may hold more than one non-FIFA nationality.

No.	Pos.	Nation	Player

Out: Note: Flags indicate national team as defined under FIFA eligibility rules; some limited exceptions apply. Players may hold more than one non-FIFA nationality.

No.	Pos.	Nation	Player

=== Shakhter Karagandy ===
In: Note: Flags indicate national team as defined under FIFA eligibility rules; some limited exceptions apply. Players may hold more than one non-FIFA nationality.

No.	Pos.	Nation	Player
8	MF	KAZ	Baūyrzhan Baytana (to (Kazakhstan) Taraz)
25	MF	SRB	Miloš Vidović (from (Croatia) Slaven Belupo)
99	FW	MOZ	Reginaldo (from (Albania) Kukësi)

Out: Note: Flags indicate national team as defined under FIFA eligibility rules; some limited exceptions apply. Players may hold more than one non-FIFA nationality.

No.	Pos.	Nation	Player
6	MF	CZE	Lukáš Droppa

=== Taraz ===
In: Note: Flags indicate national team as defined under FIFA eligibility rules; some limited exceptions apply. Players may hold more than one non-FIFA nationality.

No.	Pos.	Nation	Player
29	FW	KAZ	Samat Sarsenov (loan from (Kazakhstan) Kairat)
37	MF	KAZ	Pavel Shabalin (from (Kazakhstan) Irtysh Pavlodar)
87	DF	SRB	Aleksandar Simčević (from (Kazakhstan) Aktobe)

Out: Note: Flags indicate national team as defined under FIFA eligibility rules; some limited exceptions apply. Players may hold more than one non-FIFA nationality.

No.	Pos.	Nation	Player
8	MF	KAZ	Bekzat Beisenov
10	MF	KAZ	Baūyrzhan Baytana (to (Kazakhstan) Shakhter Karagandy)
18	DF	KAZ	Victor Kryukov

=== Tobol ===
In: Note: Flags indicate national team as defined under FIFA eligibility rules; some limited exceptions apply. Players may hold more than one non-FIFA nationality.

No.	Pos.	Nation	Player
16	GK	KAZ	Zhasur Narzikulov
25	DF	LTU	Vytautas Andriuškevičius (from (Lithuania) Sūduva)

Out: Note: Flags indicate national team as defined under FIFA eligibility rules; some limited exceptions apply. Players may hold more than one non-FIFA nationality.

No.	Pos.	Nation	Player
22	GK	KAZ	Andrey Pasechenko (on loan to (Kazakhstan) Irtysh Pavlodar)
24	DF	RUS	Aleksandr Kleshchenko
62	MF	BLR	Mikhail Gordeichuk

=== Zhetysu ===
In: Note: Flags indicate national team as defined under FIFA eligibility rules; some limited exceptions apply. Players may hold more than one non-FIFA nationality.

No.	Pos.	Nation	Player
8	MF	KAZ	Aslan Darabayev (from (Kazakhstan) Irtysh Pavlodar)
90	FW	BUL	Martin Toshev (to (Bulgaria) CSKA 1948 Sofia)
—	FW	KAZ	Rifat Nurmugamet (loan from (Kazakhstan) Kairat)

Out: Note: Flags indicate national team as defined under FIFA eligibility rules; some limited exceptions apply. Players may hold more than one non-FIFA nationality.

No.	Pos.	Nation	Player
96	MF	KAZ	Ivan Antipov (to (Kazakhstan) Atyrau)
99	FW	BUL	Ivaylo Dimitrov (loan return to Ararat-Armenia)
