= 2019 FC Okzhetpes season =

FC Okzhetpes
2019 season
- Chairman: Zheksenbai Kusainov
- Manager: Andrei Karpovich
- Stadium: Okzhetpes Stadium
- Kazakhstan Premier League: 7th
- Kazakhstan Cup: Last 16 vs Ordabasy
- Top goalscorer: League: Milan Stojanović (7); All: Milan Stojanović (7)
Home colours	Away colours

The 2019 FC Okzhetpes season is the club's first season back in the Kazakhstan Premier League following their relegation at the end of the 2017 season, and 28th season in total.

== Squad ==
As of match played 10 November 2019

No.	Name	Nationality	Position	Date of birth (age)	Signed from	Signed in	Contract ends	Apps.	Goals
Goalkeepers
1	David Loria	(Kazakhstan)	GK	31 October 1981 (age 45)	Kairat	2019			
12	Dzhurakhon Babakhanov	(Kazakhstan)	GK	31 October 1991 (age 35)	Irtysh Pavlodar	2019		16	0
31	Ruslan Abzhanov	(Kazakhstan)	GK	28 April 1990 (age 36)	Aksu	2008			
35	Yaroslav Baginsky	(Kazakhstan)	GK	3 October 1987 (age 39)	Shakhter Karagandy	2018			
Defenders
3	Nurlan Dairov	(Kazakhstan)	DF	26 June 1995 (age 31)	loan from Kairat	2019			
4	Timur Rudoselskiy	(Kazakhstan)	DF	26 June 1995 (age 31)	Hapoel Petah Tikva	2019		11	1
5	Aleksandr Kislitsyn	(Kazakhstan)	DF	8 March 1986 (age 40)	Irtysh Pavlodar	2019		40	2
18	Timur Zhakupov	(Kazakhstan)	DF	9 June 1995 (age 31)					
20	Niyaz Idrisov	(Kazakhstan)	DF	21 July 1999 (age 27)	Youth Team	2018			
21	Plamen Dimov	(Bulgaria)	DF	29 October 1990 (age 36)	Cherno More	2019	2019	15	0
23	Rinat Abdulin	(Kazakhstan)	DF	14 April 1982 (age 44)		2017			
Midfielders
6	Miras Tuliev	(Kazakhstan)	MF	30 August 1994 (age 32)	Irtysh Pavlodar	2018			
7	Tanat Nusserbayev	(Kazakhstan)	MF	1 January 1988 (age 38)	Ordabasy	2019		14	5
8	Artjom Dmitrijev	(Estonia)	MF	14 November 1988 (age 37)	Lahti	2019		30	5
9	Ulan Konysbayev	(Kazakhstan)	MF	28 May 1989 (age 37)	Aktobe	2019		3	0
10	Altynbek Saparov	(Kazakhstan)	MF	26 April 1995 (age 31)	Atyrau	2019		23	1
11	Timur Baizhanov	(Kazakhstan)	MF	30 March 1990 (age 36)	Taraz	2018			
14	Aslan Dzhanuzakov	(Kazakhstan)	MF	6 January 1993 (age 33)	Kyzylzhar	2019		1	0
24	Milan Stojanović	(Serbia)	MF	10 May 1988 (age 38)	Radnik Surdulica	2019		31	7
25	Ivan Bobko	(Ukraine)	MF	10 December 1990 (age 35)	AFC Eskilstuna	2019	2019	10	0
28	Darko Zorić	(Montenegro)	MF	12 September 1993 (age 33)	Čukarički	2019		31	4
57	Evgeny Ashikhmin	(Kazakhstan)	MF	12 December 1998 (age 27)	Youth Team				
77	Ilya Kalinin	(Kazakhstan)	MF	3 February 1992 (age 34)	Irtysh Pavlodar	2019		31	0
88	Azat Ersalimov	(Kazakhstan)	MF	19 July 1988 (age 38)	Akzhayik	2019		28	0
Forwards
14	Deimantas Petravičius	(Lithuania)	FW	2 September 1995 (age 31)	Falkirk	2019	2019	6	0
17	Zhasulan Moldakaraev	(Kazakhstan)	FW	7 May 1987 (age 39)	Ordabasy	2019		60	11
19	Almas Armenov	(Kazakhstan)	FW	27 January 1992 (age 34)					
30	Sanat Zhumakhanov	(Kazakhstan)	FW	30 January 1988 (age 38)	Ordabasy	2018			
99	Danilo Almeida Alves	(Brazil)	FW	11 April 1991 (age 35)	Flamurtari Vlorë	2019		27	6
Players away on loan
Left during the season
21	Uladzislaw Kasmynin	(Belarus)	DF	17 January 1990 (age 36)	AGMK	2019		13	1
25	Roderick Miller	(Panama)	DF	3 April 1992 (age 34)	C.D. Feirense	2019	2019	4	0

== Transfers ==
=== In ===
Date	Position	Nationality	Name	From	Fee	Ref.
18 January 2019	MF	(Serbia)	Milan Stojanović	Radnik Surdulica	Undisclosed	
19 January 2019	GK	(Kazakhstan)	Dzhurakhon Babakhanov	Irtysh Pavlodar	Undisclosed	
20 January 2019	DF	(Kazakhstan)	Aleksandr Kislitsyn	Irtysh Pavlodar	Undisclosed	
21 January 2019	DF	(Panama)	Roderick Miller	C.D. Feirense	Undisclosed	
22 January 2019	MF	(Estonia)	Artjom Dmitrijev	Lahti	Undisclosed	
6 February 2019	DF	(Kazakhstan)	Timur Rudoselskiy	Hapoel Petah Tikva	Undisclosed	
6 February 2019	MF	(Montenegro)	Darko Zorić	Čukarički	Undisclosed	
18 February 2019	FW	(Brazil)	Danilo Almeida Alves	Flamurtari Vlorë	Undisclosed	
13 March 2019	MF	(Kazakhstan)	Tanat Nusserbayev	Ordabasy	Free	
	GK	(Kazakhstan)	David Loria	Kairat	Free	
	DF	(Belarus)	Uladzislaw Kasmynin	AGMK	Undisclosed	
	MF	(Kazakhstan)	Aslan Dzhanuzakov	Kyzylzhar	Undisclosed	
	MF	(Kazakhstan)	Azat Ersalimov	Akzhayik	Undisclosed	
	MF	(Kazakhstan)	Ilya Kalinin	Irtysh Pavlodar	Undisclosed	
	MF	(Kazakhstan)	Ulan Konysbayev	Aktobe	Undisclosed	
	MF	(Kazakhstan)	Altynbek Saparov	Atyrau	Undisclosed	
	FW	(Kazakhstan)	Zhasulan Moldakaraev	Ordabasy	Undisclosed	
27 June 2019	FW	(Lithuania)	Deimantas Petravičius	Falkirk	Undisclosed	
9 July 2019	DF	(Bulgaria)	Plamen Dimov	Cherno More	Undisclosed	
23 July 2019	MF	(Ukraine)	Ivan Bobko	AFC Eskilstuna	Undisclosed	

=== Loans in ===
Date from	Position	Nationality	Name	From	Date to	Ref.
25 January 2019	DF	(Kazakhstan)	Nurlan Dairov	Kairat	End of Season	

=== Released ===
Date	Position	Nationality	Name	Joined	Date	Ref.
Summer 2019	DF	(Belarus)	Uladzislaw Kasmynin	AGMK		
25 July 2019	DF	(Panama)	Roderick Miller	Carlos Stein		
31 December 2019	GK	(Kazakhstan)	Dzhurakhon Babakhanov	Taraz		
31 December 2019	DF	(Kazakhstan)	Rinat Abdulin	Retired		
31 December 2019	DF	(Kazakhstan)	Aleksandr Kislitsyn	Shakhter Karagandy	8 February 2020	
31 December 2019	DF	(Kazakhstan)	Timur Rudoselskiy	Smolevichi		
31 December 2019	MF	(Kazakhstan)	Timur Baizhanov	Irtysh Pavlodar	28 January 2020	
31 December 2019	MF	(Kazakhstan)	Ulan Konysbayev			
31 December 2019	MF	(Kazakhstan)	Tanat Nusserbayev			
31 December 2019	MF	(Ukraine)	Ivan Bobko	Torpedo Kutaisi		
31 December 2019	FW	(Brazil)	Danilo Almeida Alves	Suwon		
31 December 2019	FW	(Lithuania)	Deimantas Petravičius	Queen of the South	30 January 2020	

=== Trial ===
Date From	Date To	Position	Nationality	Name	Last club	Ref.

== Competitions ==
=== Premier League ===
==== Results summary ====
Overall								Home						Away					
Pld	W	D	L	GF	GA	GD	Pts	W	D	L	GF	GA	GD	W	D	L	GF	GA	GD
33	11	7	15	44	49	−5	40	5	4	7	21	20	+1	6	3	8	23	29	−6

Last updated: 10 November 2019.
Source: See Results

==== Results by round ====
Round	1	2	3	4	5	6	7	8	9	10	11	12	13	14	15	16	17	18	19	20	21	22	23	24	25	26	27	28	29	30	31	32	33
Ground	A	A	H	A	H	A	H	A	H	A	H	H	A	H	A	H	A	H	A	H	A	H	H	A	A	H	A	H	A	A	H	H	A
Result	L	L	D	L	L	W	W	W	D	W	L	D	L	L	L	W	L	W	L	W	W	L	L	W	L	W	D	L	W	D	L	D	D
Position	11	10	10	11	11	10	8	8	8	8	8	8	8	8	8	8	8	8	8	8	8	8	8	8	8	8	7	7	7	7	7	7	7

Source: See Results
A = Away; H = Home; W = Win; D = Draw; L = Loss

==== Results ====
9 March 2019 1	Zhetysu	5 – 1	Okzhetpes	Taldıqorğan
15:00 (UTC+6)	A.Makhambetov 11' (yellow card) 53'; Naumov 15'; E.Altynbekov 31'; Adamović 79'; Zhaksylykov 87'	Report	Kasmynin (yellow card) 35' (yellow-red card) 61'; Alves (yellow card) 44'; Stojanović (yellow card) 53'; Moldakaraev 55'; Rudoselskiy (yellow card) 58'; S.Zhumakhanov (yellow card) 90'	Stadium: Zhetysu Stadium Reserve Field; Attendance: 1,000; Referee: Bagdat Abdullaev

15 March 2019 2	Astana	2 – 1	Okzhetpes	Astana
19:30 (UTC+6)	Janga 59'; Mayewski 72'	Report	D.Babakhanov (yellow card) 54'; Dmitrijev 69'; Stojanović (yellow card) 82'	Stadium: Astana Arena; Attendance: 2,700; Referee: Igor Aleshin

31 March 2019 3	Okzhetpes	0 – 0	Ordabasy	Astana
19:00 (UTC+6)	Kislitsyn (yellow card) 65'; Zorić (yellow card) 76'; S.Zhumakhanov (yellow card) 90+2'	Report	Korobkin (yellow card) 71'; Dosmagambetov (yellow card) 76'	Stadium: Astana Arena; Attendance: 700; Referee: Bolat aryev

6 April 2019 4	Kairat	4 – 1	Okzhetpes	Almaty
17:00 (UTC+6)	Vorogovskiy (yellow card) 2'; Eseola 11', 27'; Palitsevich (yellow card) 39'; Dugalić 44', 81'; S.Astanov (yellow card) 67'	Report	S.Zhumakhanov 2' (yellow card) 75'; Miller (yellow card) 30'	Stadium: Central Stadium; Attendance: 2,800; Referee: Bagdat Abdullaev

14 April 2019 5	Okzhetpes	1 – 2	Tobol	Kokshetau
15:00 (UTC+6)	Moldakaraev (yellow card) 51'; Kasmynin (yellow card) 65'; S.Zhumakhanov (yellow card) 71'; Nusserbayev 90'	Report	Kvekveskiri 42'; Fedin 56'; Miroshnichenko (yellow card) 70'; Žulpa (red card) 71'; Balayev (yellow card) 90+1'	Stadium: Okzhetpes Stadium; Attendance: 3,000; Referee: Igor Chesnokov

20 April 2019 6	Atyrau	1 – 2	Okzhetpes	Shymkent
17:00 (UTC+6)	Žunić (yellow card) 45'; Ivančić 65'; Loginovsky (yellow card) 77'	Report	Stojanović 5'; Kasmynin (yellow card) 18'; Nusserbayev 33'; Moldakaraev (yellow card) 42'; Dmitrijev (yellow card) 77'	Stadium: Namys Stadion; Attendance: 250; Referee: Denis Tevyashov

27 April 2019 7	Okzhetpes	1 – 0	Irtysh Pavlodar	Kokshetau
15:00 (UTC+6)	S.Zhumakhanov 26'; I.Kalinin (yellow card) 39'; Kasmynin (yellow card) 75'; Stojanović (yellow card) 83'	Report	A.Nusip (yellow card) 36'; Darabayev (yellow card) 45'; R.Yesimov (yellow card) 57'; Fonseca (yellow card) 72'; A.Popov (yellow card) 77'	Stadium: Okzhetpes Stadium; Attendance: 1,700; Referee: Timur Kumashev

1 May 2019 8	Taraz	2 – 6	Okzhetpes	Taraz
17:00 (UTC+6)	Elivelto 19', 23'; I.Pikalkin (yellow card) 53' (yellow-red card) 66'; A.Taubay (yellow card) 61'; Gian (yellow card) 72'	Report	S.Otarbayev 14' (o.g.); I.Kalinin (yellow card) 20'; Zorić 30'; N.Dairov (yellow card) 51'; Kasmynin 62'; Stojanović 73' (pen.); A.Saparov 79' (yellow card) 82'; Kislitsyn 86'	Stadium: Central Stadium; Attendance: 4,000; Referee: Anatolyi Vishnichenko

5 May 2019 9	Okzhetpes	2 – 2	Shakhter Karagandy	Kokshetau
15:00 (UTC+6)	Zorić (yellow card) 45' (goal) 59'; Kislitsyn (yellow card) 74'; Alves 78'; Moldakaraev (yellow card) 79'	Report	Zenjov 73', 84'; Tkachuk (yellow card) 74'; J.Payruz (yellow card) 90+1'	Stadium: Okzhetpes Stadium; Attendance: 2,100; Referee: Bakhyt Kyzylbaev

12 May 2019 10	Aktobe	0 – 2	Okzhetpes	Aktobe
19:00 (UTC+6)	A.Shurigin (yellow card) 29'; A.Saulet (yellow card) 69'; A.Tanzharikov (red card) 77'	Report	Kukeyev 33' (o.g.); Dmitrijev (yellow card) 49' (goal) 53'; A.Saparov (yellow card) 82'	Stadium: Central Stadium; Attendance: 7,500; Referee: Furkat Atajanov

18 May 2019 11	Okzhetpes	1 – 2	Kaisar	Kokshetau
17:00 (UTC+6)	Alves 37'; Dmitrijev (yellow card) 80'	Report	Barseghyan 10'; John 74'; V.Chureyev (yellow card) 84'	Stadium: Okzhetpes Stadium; Attendance: 3,000; Referee: Aydin Rakhimbayev

26 May 2019 12	Okzhetpes	1 – 1	Astana	Kokshetau
17:00 (UTC+6)	S.Zhumakhanov (yellow card) 49'; Alves (yellow card) 53'; Stojanović 90+1'	Report	Logvinenko (yellow card) 32'; Mayewski (yellow card) 32'; Murtazayev 45' (yellow card) 60'; Postnikov (yellow card) 54'; Muzhikov (yellow card) 90+4' (yellow-red card) 90+4'	Stadium: Okzhetpes Stadium; Attendance: 2,700; Referee: Ruslan Omarov

31 May 2019 13	Ordabasy	3 – 0	Okzhetpes	Shymkent
18:00 (UTC+6)	João Paulo 5'; Zhangylyshbay 14', 38'; Dosmagambetov (yellow card) 44'	Report	S.Zhumakhanov (yellow card) 42'; T.Zhakupov (yellow card) 46'; Stojanović (yellow card) 71'; N.Dairov (yellow card) 81'; Kasmynin (yellow card) 87'	Stadium: Kazhymukan Munaitpasov Stadium; Attendance: 2,700; Referee: Igor Chesnokov

16 June 2019 14	Okzhetpes	1 – 2	Kairat	Kokshetau
17:00 (UTC+6)	Alves (yellow card) 46'; S.Zhumakhanov 90'; Dmitrijev (yellow card) 90+1'	Report	Islamkhan 9' (yellow card) 90+1'; Kuat (yellow card) 32'; Eseola (yellow card) 48' (goal) 75'	Stadium: Okzhetpes Stadium; Attendance: 3,000; Referee: Grigory Moskovchenko

23 June 2019 15	Tobol	2 – 0	Okzhetpes	Kostanay
19:00 (UTC+6)	S.Zharynbetov (yellow card) 5'; Sebai 58'; Nurgaliev 69'	Report	A.Ersalimov (yellow card) 3'; Nusserbayev (yellow card) 35'; Kislitsyn (yellow card) 82'; I.Kalinin (yellow card) 90+3'	Stadium: Central Stadium; Attendance: 4,500; Referee: Furkat Atajanov

30 June 2019 16	Okzhetpes	3 – 0	Atyrau	Kokshetau
17:00 (UTC+6)	N.Dairov (yellow card) 15'; Nusserbayev 45+2' (pen.); Alves 62'; Zorić (yellow card) 70'; S.Zhumakhanov 86'	Report		Stadium: Okzhetpes Stadium; Attendance: 2,500; Referee: Denis Izmailov

6 July 2019 17	Irtysh Pavlodar	2 – 1	Okzhetpes	Pavlodar
19:00 (UTC+6)	Fonseca (yellow card) 40'; Vitas 50', 74' (yellow card) 90+4'; Manzorro (yellow card) 68'	Report	Dmitrijev (yellow card) 16'; Moldakaraev 52'; S.Zhumakhanov (yellow card) 87'; Nusserbayev (yellow card) 90+4'	Stadium: Central Stadium; Attendance: 2,800; Referee: Sergey Gorokhovodatskiy

14 July 2019 18	Okzhetpes	3 – 1	Taraz	Kokshetau
18:00 (UTC+6)	Moldakaraev (yellow card) 27' (yellow-red card) 82'; Stojanović 49' (pen.); A.Saparov (yellow card) 70'; Kasradze 76' (o.g.); S.Zhumakhanov 80'	Report	R.Rozybakiev (yellow card) 9'; Nyuiadzi 35' (yellow card) 41'; A.Taubay (yellow card) 38'; Jovanović (red card) 41'; B.Shadmanov (yellow card) 72'	Stadium: Okzhetpes Stadium; Attendance: 1,700; Referee: Arman Ismuratov

21 July 2019 19	Shakhter Karagandy	1 – 0	Okzhetpes	Karaganda
19:00 (UTC+6)	Tkachuk (yellow card) 24' (goal) 57'; Shakhmetov (yellow card) 63'; Nurgaliyev (yellow card) 66'	Report	S.Zhumakhanov (red card) 64'; Dimov (yellow card) 78'	Stadium: Shakhter Stadium; Attendance: 4,000; Referee: Aydin Rakhimbayev

27 July 2019 20	Okzhetpes	4 – 0	Aktobe	Kokshetau
18:00 (UTC+6)	Dmitrijev 8' (yellow card) 90+2'; Moldakaraev 54', 76'; Alves (yellow card) 77'; Bobko (yellow card) 79'; Zorić 83' (pen.) (yellow card) 84'; N.Dairov (yellow card) 90+3'	Report	O.Kitsak (yellow card) 38'; E.Zhasanov (yellow card) 51'	Stadium: Okzhetpes Stadium; Attendance: 1,600; Referee: Bolat Saryev

3 August 2019 21	Kaisar	0 – 1	Okzhetpes	Kyzylorda
20:00 (UTC+6)	Mbombo (yellow card) 37'; Tagybergen (yellow card) 74'; I.Amirseitov (yellow card) 76'; Barseghyan (yellow card) 90+5'	Report	Bobko (yellow card) 30'; Moldakaraev 40' (yellow card) 73'; A.Saparov (yellow card) 42'; T.Zhakupov (yellow card) 49'; Y.Baginsky (yellow card) 90+4'	Stadium: Gani Muratbayev Stadium; Attendance: 3,500; Referee: Denis Tevyashov

10 August 2019 22	Okzhetpes	0 – 1	Zhetysu	Kokshetau
17:00 (UTC+6)		Report	Toshev 4'; E.Altynbekov (yellow card) 59'; Kuklys (yellow card) 88'	Stadium: Okzhetpes Stadium; Attendance: 1,800; Referee: Anatolyi Vishnichenko

17 August 2019 23	Okzhetpes	0 – 4	Ordabasy	Kokshetau
17:00 (UTC+6)	Zorić (yellow card) 15'; N.Dairov (yellow card) 46'; S.Zhumakhanov (yellow card) 65'	Report	Mehanović 13'; Malyi (yellow card) 26'; João Paulo 34', 55'; Bystrov (yellow card) 40'; Erlanov 68'; Nepohodov (yellow card) 75'	Stadium: Okzhetpes Stadium; Attendance: 2,200; Referee: Timur Kumashev

25 August 2019 24	Kairat	0 – 1	Okzhetpes	Almaty
20:00 (UTC+6)	Suyumbayev (yellow card) 45+2'; Kuat (yellow card) 53'; Eseola (yellow card) 54'	Report	Zorić 6'; Moldakaraev (yellow card) 54'; A.Saparov (yellow card) 76'; Y.Baginsky (yellow card) 90+3'	Stadium: Central Stadium; Attendance: 7,000; Referee: Daniyar Sakhi

15 September 2019 26	Tobol	1 – 0	Okzhetpes	Kostanay
18:00 (UTC+6)	Fedin (yellow card) 12'; Abilgazy (yellow card) 45+2'; Sebai 87' (yellow card) 90+2'	Report	A.Ersalimov (yellow card) 90+4'; N.Dairov (yellow card) 29'; Dimov (yellow card) 53'; Alves (yellow card) 90+4'	Stadium: Central Stadium; Attendance: 4,000; Referee: Bagdat Abdullaev

21 September 2019 27	Okzhetpes	1 – 0	Irtysh Pavlodar	Kokshetau
15:00 (UTC+6)	Moldakaraev (yellow card) 24'; Stojanović 63'; Zorić (yellow card) 72'	Report	Vitas (yellow card) 83'	Stadium: Okzhetpes Stadium; Attendance: 1,700; Referee: Daniyar Sakhi

29 September 2019 28	Atyrau	2 – 2	Okzhetpes	Atyrau
16:00 (UTC+6)	Ustinov (red card) 4'; Abdulavov 31'; Grzelczak 35'	Report	Alves 27' (yellow card) 55'; Dimov (yellow card) 53'; Stojanović 66'	Stadium: Munaishy Stadium; Attendance: 2,000; Referee: Zhandos Abzhan

5 October 2019 29	Okzhetpes	2 – 3	Taraz	Kokshetau
15:00 (UTC+6)	Stojanović 20' (pen.); Alves 28'; N.Dairov (yellow card) 35'; Dmitrijev (yellow card) 42'; T.Zhakupov (yellow card) 71'	Report	A.Suley (yellow card) 37' (goal) 43'; Gian (yellow card) 47' (yellow-red card) 59'; M.Amirkhanov (yellow card) 62'; Jovanović (yellow card) 64'; Lobjanidze 66', 89'; A.Taubay (yellow card) 85'	Stadium: Okzhetpes Stadium; Attendance: 2,000; Referee: Sergey Gorokhovodatskiy

20 October 2019 30	Aktobe	1 – 2	Okzhetpes	Aktobe
17:00 (UTC+6)	Pizzelli 38'; O.Kitsak (yellow card) 47'; R.Temirkhan (yellow card) 69'	Report	Alves 34'; Dmitrijev 48'; Dimov (yellow card) 86'; Moldakaraev (yellow card) 88'; T.Zhakupov (yellow card) 90+4'	Stadium: Central Stadium; Attendance: 6,000; Referee: Aydin Rakhimbayev

26 October 2019 31	Shakhter Karagandy	2 – 2	Okzhetpes	Nur-Sultan
15:00 (UTC+6)	Reginaldo 5', 53'; J.Payruz (yellow card) 45'; Chichulin (yellow card) 85'	Report	Dmitrijev 29'; Stojanović (yellow card) 50'; Rudoselskiy 51'; Moldakaraev (yellow card) 67'; Zorić (red card) 84'; Nusserbayev (yellow card) 90+3'; R.Abzhanov (yellow card) 90+4'	Stadium: Astana Arena; Attendance: 1,000; Referee: Grigory Moskovchenko
Note: Match played at the Astana Arena instead of Shakhter's regular home ground, Shakhter Stadium. Astana was re-named Nur-Sultan on 23 March 2019.

30 October 2019 25	Okzhetpes	0 – 1	Astana	Kokshetau
15:00 (UTC+6)	A.Saparov (yellow card) 27'; Alves (yellow card) 73'; T.Zhakupov (yellow card) 90+3'	Report	Logvinenko 33'	Stadium: Okzhetpes Stadium; Attendance: 2,500; Referee: Bakhyt Kyzylbaev
Note: Match originally scheduled for 1 September 2019 but postponed due to Astana's involvement in UEFA Europa League qualifiers.

3 November 2019 32	Okzhetpes	1 – 1	Zhetysu	Kokshetau
15:00 (UTC+6)	Dimov (yellow card) 10'; Dmitrijev (yellow card) 71'; Nusserbayev 78'; Kislitsyn (yellow card) 81'	Report	Ibraev (yellow card) 17'; Toshev 75'	Stadium: Okzhetpes Stadium; Attendance: 1,500; Referee: Bagdat Abdullaev

10 November 2019 33	Kaisar	1 – 1	Okzhetpes	Kyzylorda
15:00 (UTC+6)	Barseghyan 40'; Lamanje (yellow card) 50'; I.Amirseitov (yellow card) 60'; V.Chureyev (yellow card) 80'; D.Chureyev (yellow card) 85'	Report	E.Ashikhmin (yellow card) 25'; S.Zhumakhanov (yellow card) 27'; Moldakaraev (yellow card) 63'; Nusserbayev 84'	Stadium: Gani Muratbayev Stadium; Attendance: 2,500; Referee: Artyom Kuchin

==== League table ====
Pos	Team	Pld	W	D	L	GF	GA	GD	Pts	Qualification or relegation
5	Zhetysu	33	16	8	9	45	25	+20	56	
6	Kaisar	33	12	6	15	37	43	−6	42	Qualification for the Europa League second qualifying round (Note: Kaisar qualified for the Europa League second qualifying round by winning the 2019 Kazakhstan Cup.)
7	Okzhetpes	33	11	7	15	44	49	−5	40	
8	Irtysh Pavlodar	33	11	4	18	30	45	−15	37	
9	Shakhter Karagandy	33	9	8	16	40	47	−7	35	

Source: UEFA, Soccerway
Rules for classification: 1) Points; 2) Goal difference; 3) Matches won; 4) Goals scored; 5) Away goals scored; 6) Head-to-head points; 7) Head-to-head matches won; 8) Head-to-head goal difference; 9) Head-to-head goals scored; 10) Head-to-head away goals scored; 11) Draw.

=== Kazakhstan Cup ===
10 April 2019 Last 16	Okzhetpes	0 – 1	Ordabasy	Kokshetau
15:00 (UTC+6)	S.Zhumakhanov (yellow card) 38'; Kislitsyn (yellow card) 39'; Stojanović (yellow card) 55'; Kasmynin (yellow card) 82'	Report	Vitali Li (yellow card) 23'; Erlanov (yellow card) 65' (goal) 75'	Stadium: Okzhetpes Stadium; Attendance: 2,700; Referee: Bakhyt Kyzylbaev

== Squad statistics ==
As of match played 10 November 2019

=== Appearances and goals ===
No.	Pos	Nat	Player	Total		Premier League		Kazakhstan Cup	
No.	Pos	Nat	Player	Apps	Goals	Apps	Goals	Apps	Goals
3	DF	(Kazakhstan) KAZ	Nurlan Dairov	27	0	25+1	0	1	0
4	DF	(Kazakhstan) KAZ	Timur Rudoselskiy	12	1	11	1	1	0
5	DF	(Kazakhstan) KAZ	Aleksandr Kislitsyn	32	1	30+1	1	1	0
6	MF	(Kazakhstan) KAZ	Miras Tuliev	15	0	2+13	0	0	0
7	MF	(Kazakhstan) KAZ	Tanat Nusserbayev	15	5	8+6	5	0+1	0
8	MF	(Estonia) EST	Artjom Dmitrijev	31	5	29+1	5	0+1	0
9	MF	(Kazakhstan) KAZ	Ulan Konysbayev	3	0	0+3	0	0	0
10	MF	(Kazakhstan) KAZ	Altynbek Saparov	24	1	12+12	1	0	0
12	GK	(Kazakhstan) KAZ	Dzhurakhon Babakhanov	11	0	11	0	0	0
14	FW	(Lithuania) LTU	Deimantas Petravičius	6	0	1+5	0	0	0
17	FW	(Kazakhstan) KAZ	Zhasulan Moldakaraev	28	5	20+7	5	1	0
18	DF	(Kazakhstan) KAZ	Timur Zhakupov	15	0	4+11	0	0	0
21	DF	(Bulgaria) BUL	Plamen Dimov	16	0	16	0	0	0
23	DF	(Kazakhstan) KAZ	Rinat Abdulin	6	0	4+2	0	0	0
24	MF	(Serbia) SRB	Milan Stojanović	32	7	29+2	7	1	0
25	MF	(Ukraine) UKR	Ivan Bobko	11	0	11	0	0	0
28	MF	(Montenegro) MNE	Darko Zorić	31	4	30	4	1	0
30	FW	(Kazakhstan) KAZ	Sanat Zhumakhanov	31	4	15+15	4	1	0
31	GK	(Kazakhstan) KAZ	Ruslan Abzhanov	10	0	9+1	0	0	0
35	GK	(Kazakhstan) KAZ	Yaroslav Baginsky	16	0	14+1	0	1	0
57	MF	(Kazakhstan) KAZ	Evgeny Ashikhmin	2	0	1+1	0	0	0
77	MF	(Kazakhstan) KAZ	Ilya Kalinin	32	0	29+2	0	1	0
88	MF	(Kazakhstan) KAZ	Azat Ersalimov	28	0	22+5	0	1	0
99	FW	(Brazil) BRA	Danilo Almeida Alves	28	6	26+2	6	0	0
Players away from Okzhetpes on loan:
Players who left Okzhetpes during the season:
21	DF	(Belarus) BLR	Uladzislaw Kasmynin	13	1	12	1	1	0
25	DF	(Panama) PAN	Roderick Miller	4	0	3+1	0	0	0

=== Goal scorers ===
Place	Position	Nation	Number	Name	Premier League	Kazakhstan Cup	Total
1	MF	(Serbia)	24	Milan Stojanović	7	0	7
2	FW	(Brazil)	99	Danilo Almeida Alves	6	0	6
3	FW	(Kazakhstan)	30	Sanat Zhumakhanov	5	0	5
3	FW	(Kazakhstan)	17	Zhasulan Moldakaraev	5	0	5
3	MF	(Estonia)	8	Artjom Dmitrijev	5	0	5
3	MF	(Kazakhstan)	7	Tanat Nusserbayev	5	0	5
7	MF	(Montenegro)	28	Darko Zorić	4	0	4
8				Own goal	3	0	3
9	DF	(Belarus)	21	Uladzislaw Kasmynin	1	0	1
9	MF	(Kazakhstan)	10	Altynbek Saparov	1	0	1
9	DF	(Kazakhstan)	5	Aleksandr Kislitsyn	1	0	1
9	DF	(Kazakhstan)	4	Timur Rudoselskiy	1	0	1
				TOTALS	44	0	44

=== Disciplinary record ===
Number	Nation	Position	Name	Premier League		Kazakhstan Cup		Total	
Number	Nation	Position	Name	Yellow card	Red card	Yellow card	Red card	Yellow card	Red card
2	(Kazakhstan)	DF	Nurlan Dairov	6	0	0	0	6	0
3	(Kazakhstan)	DF	Nurlan Dairov	2	0	0	0	2	0
4	(Kazakhstan)	DF	Timur Rudoselskiy	1	0	0	0	1	0
5	(Kazakhstan)	DF	Aleksandr Kislitsyn	4	0	1	0	5	0
7	(Kazakhstan)	MF	Tanat Nusserbayev	3	0	0	0	3	0
8	(Estonia)	MF	Artjom Dmitrijev	8	0	0	0	8	0
10	(Kazakhstan)	MF	Altynbek Saparov	6	0	0	0	6	0
12	(Kazakhstan)	GK	Dzhurakhon Babakhanov	1	0	0	0	1	0
17	(Kazakhstan)	FW	Zhasulan Moldakaraev	11	1	0	0	11	1
18	(Kazakhstan)	DF	Timur Zhakupov	5	0	0	0	5	0
21	(Bulgaria)	DF	Plamen Dimov	6	0	0	0	6	0
24	(Serbia)	MF	Milan Stojanović	5	0	1	0	6	0
25	(Ukraine)	MF	Ivan Bobko	2	0	0	0	2	0
28	(Montenegro)	MF	Darko Zorić	6	1	0	0	6	1
30	(Kazakhstan)	FW	Sanat Zhumakhanov	9	1	1	0	10	1
31	(Kazakhstan)	GK	Ruslan Abzhanov	1	0	0	0	1	0
35	(Kazakhstan)	GK	Yaroslav Baginsky	2	0	0	0	2	0
57	(Kazakhstan)	MF	Evgeny Ashikhmin	1	0	0	0	1	0
77	(Kazakhstan)	MF	Ilya Kalinin	3	0	0	0	3	0
88	(Kazakhstan)	MF	Azat Ersalimov	3	0	0	0	3	0
99	(Brazil)	FW	Danilo Almeida Alves	8	0	0	0	8	0
Players who left Okzhetpes during the season:
21	(Belarus)	DF	Uladzislaw Kasmynin	6	1	1	0	7	1
25	(Panama)	DF	Roderick Miller	1	0	0	0	1	0
			TOTALS	100	4	4	0	104	4
