= 2019 Kazakhstan Premier League =

Kazakhstan Premier League
- Season: 2019
- Champions: Astana
- Relegated: Atyrau; Aktobe
- Champions League: Astana
- Europa League: Kairat; Ordabasy; Kaisar (via Kazakhstan Cup)
- Matches: 192
- Goals: 495 (2.58 per match)
- Top goalscorer: Marin Tomasov (19); Aderinsola Eseola (19)
- Highest attendance: 16,200- Astana vs Kairat (20 October 2019)
- Lowest attendance: 200 - Atyrau vs Taraz (31 May 2019)
- Total attendance: 720,250
- Average attendance: 3,751 (10 November 2019)
- All statistics correct as of 11 November 2019.

The 2019 Kazakhstan Premier League was the 28th season of the Kazakhstan Premier League, the highest football league competition in Kazakhstan. FC Astana defended their title, winning the championship for the sixth season in a row, whilst FC Atyrau and FC Aktobe were relegated and FC Taraz survived a relegation playoff against FC Akzhayik.

== Teams ==
FC Kyzylzhar and FC Akzhayik were relegated at the end of the 2018 season, and were replaced by FC Okzhetpes and FC Taraz.

=== Team overview ===
Locations of teams in the 2019 Kazakhstan Premier League

Team	Location	Venue	Capacity
Aktobe	Aktobe	Aktobe Central Stadium	15,000
Astana	Nur-Sultan	Nur-Sultan Arena	30,000
Atyrau	Atyrau	Munaishy Stadium	8,690
Irtysh	Pavlodar	Pavlodar Central Stadium	15,000
Kairat	Almaty	Almaty Central Stadium	25,057
Kaisar	Kyzylorda	Gani Muratbayev Stadium	7,500
Okzhetpes	Kokshetau	Alisher Sagynbayev Stadium	4,158
Ordabasy	Shymkent	Kazhymukan Munaitpasov Stadium	20,000
Shakhter	Karaganda	Shakhter Stadium	20,000
Taraz	Taraz	Yerkebulan Babayev Stadium	11,525
Tobol	Kostanay	Bauyrzhan Sagintayev Stadium	10,500
Zhetysu	Taldykorgan	Samat Suyumbayev Stadium	4,000

=== Personnel and kits ===
Note: Flags indicate national team as has been defined under FIFA eligibility rules. Players and Managers may hold more than one non-FIFA nationality.

Team	Manager	Captain	Kit manufacturer	Shirt sponsor
Aktobe	(Ukraine) Mykhaylo Fomenko	(Armenia) Marcos Pizzelli	Adidas	—
Astana	(Ukraine) Roman Hryhorchuk	(Kazakhstan) Dmitri Shomko	Adidas	Samruk-Kazyna
Atyrau	(Russia) Yuri Krasnozhan	(Kazakhstan) Marat Khayrullin	Nike	—
Irtysh	(Uzbekistan) Samvel Babayan	(Kazakhstan) Nikita Kalmykov	Nike	ENRC
Kairat	(Kazakhstan) Talgat Baysufinov	(Kazakhstan) Bauyrzhan Islamkhan	Nike	Halyk Bank
Kaisar	(Bulgaria) Stoycho Mladenov	(Kazakhstan) Maksat Baizhanov	Nike	—
Okzhetpes	(Kazakhstan) Bakhytzhan Babayev		Adidas	—
Ordabasy	(Georgia (country)) Kakhaber Tskhadadze	(Kazakhstan) Azat Nurgaliev	Nike	Aysu Mineral Water
Shakhter	(Bulgaria) Nikolay Kostov	(Kazakhstan) Evgeniy Tarasov	Nike	BTL Kazakhstan
Taraz	(Kazakhstan) Nurken Mazbaev	(Kazakhstan) Ilya Vorotnikov	Nike	—
Tobol	(Russia) Vladimir Gazzayev	(Kazakhstan) Azat Nurgaliev	Adidas	Polymetal
Zhetysu	(Kazakhstan) Dmitry Ogai		Adidas	—

=== Foreign players ===
The number of foreign players is restricted to eight per KPL team. A team can use only five foreign players on the field in each game.

Club	Player 1	Player 2	Player 3	Player 4	Player 5	Player 6	Player 7	Player 8	Player 9
Aktobe	(Armenia) **Marcos Pizzelli**	(Croatia) Hrvoje Miličević	(Ukraine) Oleksandr Kitsak						
Astana	(Belarus) **Ivan Mayewski**	(Croatia) Luka Šimunović	(Croatia) **Marin Tomasov**	(Curaçao) **Rangelo Janga**	(Democratic Republic of the Congo) **Ndombe Mubele**	(Iceland) **Rúnar Már Sigurjónsson**	(Montenegro) **Žarko Tomašević**	(Romania) **Dorin Rotariu**	(Serbia) **Antonio Rukavina**
Atyrau	(Brazil) Alex Bruno	(Croatia) Sebastijan Antić	(Croatia) Antun Marković	(Cameroon) Jacques Alberto Ngwem	(Poland) Piotr Grzelczak	(Russia) Islamnur Abdulavov	(Russia) Vitali Ustinov	(Senegal) Boubacar Mansaly	(Ukraine) Rizvan Ablitarov
Irtysh	(France) Jérémy Manzorro	(Hungary) Patrik Hidi	(Portugal) Carlos Fonseca	(Serbia) Dejan Georgijević	(Serbia) Milan Mirosavljev	(Serbia) Miloš Stamenković	(Serbia) Uroš Vitas	(Turkmenistan) **Ruslan Mingazow**	
Kairat	(Belarus) **Syarhey Palitsevich**	(Croatia) Dino Mikanović	(Hungary) **Márton Eppel**	(South Korea) Han Jeong-uh	(Montenegro) **Nebojša Kosović**	(Poland) Konrad Wrzesiński	(Serbia) Rade Dugalić	(Ukraine) Aderinsola Eseola	
Kaisar	(Armenia) **Tigran Barseghyan**	(Aruba) **Joshua John**	(Belarus) Ivan Sadownichy	(Cameroon) Abdel Lamanje	(Croatia) Ivan Graf	(Democratic Republic of the Congo) **André Bukia**	(Democratic Republic of the Congo) Kule Mbombo	(Serbia) Bratislav Punoševac	
Okzhetpes	(Brazil) Danilo Almeida Alves	(Bulgaria) Plamen Dimov	(Estonia) **Artjom Dmitrijev**	(Lithuania) **Deimantas Petravičius**	(Montenegro) **Darko Zorić**	(Serbia) Milan Stojanović	(Ukraine) Ivan Bobko		
Ordabasy	(Argentina) Pablo Fontanello	(Belgium) Ziguy Badibanga	(Bosnia and Herzegovina) Mirzad Mehanović	(Brazil) João Paulo	(South Africa) **May Mahlangu**	(Senegal) Abdoulaye Diakate	(Ukraine) **Kyrylo Kovalchuk**		
Shakhter	(Croatia) Ivan Pešić	(Estonia) **Sergei Zenjov**	(Kosovo) Donjet Shkodra	(Mozambique) **Reginaldo**	(Serbia) Miloš Vidović	(Uganda) **Luwagga Kizito**	(Ukraine) Artem Baranovskyi	(Ukraine) Yevhen Tkachuk	
Taraz	(Brazil) Elivelto	(Brazil) Gian	(Georgia (country)) Lasha Kasradze	(Georgia (country)) **Elguja Lobjanidze**	(Serbia) Mihailo Jovanović	(Serbia) Aleksandar Simčević	(Serbia) Nemanja Subotić	(Togo) Serge Nyuiadzi	
Tobol	(Azerbaijan) **Emil Balayev**	(Central African Republic) **Fernander Kassaï**	(Georgia (country)) **Nika Kvekveskiri**	(Georgia (country)) **Jaba Kankava**	(Ivory Coast) Senin Sebai	(Lithuania) **Vytautas Andriuškevičius**	(Lithuania) **Artūras Žulpa**	(Russia) Nikita Bocharov	
Zhetysu	(Armenia) **Kamo Hovhannisyan**	(Belarus) Andrey Lebedzew	(Belarus) **Nikita Naumov**	(Bulgaria) Martin Toshev	(Ghana) David Mawutor	(Lithuania) **Mantas Kuklys**	(Moldova) Oleg Hromțov	(Serbia) Nenad Adamović	(Ukraine) Ruslan Stepanyuk

In bold: Players that have been capped for their national team.

=== Managerial changes ===
Team	Outgoing manager	Manner of departure	Date of vacancy	Position in table	Incoming manager	Date of appointment
Kairat	(Kazakhstan) Andrei Karpovich (Caretaker)	End of Contract	25 November 2018	Pre-Season	(Belarus) Aleksey Shpilevsky	25 November 2018
Aktobe	(Russia) Vladimir Mukhanov			Pre-Season	(Belarus) Aleksandr Sednyov	9 January 2019
Okzhetpes	(Russia) Sergey Popkov			Pre-Season	(Russia) Andrei Karpovich	3 January 2019
Tobol	(Poland) Marek Zub	End of Contract	31 December 2018	Pre-Season	(Russia) Vladimir Gazzayev	31 December 2018
Atyrau	(Russia) Viktor Kumykov	Mutual Consent	27 April 2019	11th	(Kazakhstan) Kuanysh Kuandulov (Caretaker)	27 April 2019
Irtysh Pavlodar	(Bulgaria) Dimitar Dimitrov	Suspended	2 May 2019	9th	(Kazakhstan) Sergey Klimov (Caretaker)	2 May 2019
Atyrau	(Kazakhstan) Kuanysh Kuandulov (Caretaker)	End of Caretaker Role	3 May 2019	11th	(Belarus) Oleg Dulub	3 May 2019
Irtysh Pavlodar	(Kazakhstan) Sergey Klimov (Caretaker)	End of Caretaker Role	7 June 2019	9th	(Serbia) Milan Milanović	7 June 2019
Tobol	(Russia) Vladimir Gazzayev	Resigned	21 July 2019	1st	(Kazakhstan) Nurbol Zhumaskaliyev (Caretaker)	22 July 2019

== Regular season ==
=== Table ===
Pos	Team	Pld	W	D	L	GF	GA	GD	Pts	Qualification or relegation
1	Astana (C)	33	22	3	8	67	28	+39	69	Qualification for the Champions League first qualifying round
2	Kairat	33	22	2	9	65	32	+33	68	Qualification for the Europa League first qualifying round
3	Ordabasy	33	19	8	6	52	24	+28	65	Qualification for the Europa League first qualifying round
4	Tobol	33	19	6	8	45	27	+18	63	
5	Zhetysu	33	16	8	9	45	25	+20	56	
6	Kaisar	33	12	6	15	37	43	−6	42	Qualification for the Europa League second qualifying round (Note: Kaisar qualified for the Europa League second qualifying round by winning the 2019 Kazakhstan Cup.)
7	Okzhetpes	33	11	7	15	44	49	−5	40	
8	Irtysh Pavlodar	33	11	4	18	30	45	−15	37	
9	Shakhter Karagandy	33	9	8	16	40	47	−7	35	
10	Taraz (O)	33	7	8	18	28	60	−32	29	Qualification for the relegation play-offs
11	Atyrau (R)	33	6	8	19	25	58	−33	26	Relegation to the Kazakhstan First Division
12	Aktobe (Note: Aktobe had six points deducted on 18 February 2019 as a punishment for unpaid debts to former player Dele Adeleye. On 14 March 2019, Aktobe were handed a further six point deduction for unpaid debts to former player Nemanja Nikolić.) (R)	33	7	6	20	35	75	−40	15	Relegation to the Kazakhstan First Division

Source: UEFA, Soccerway
Rules for classification: 1) Points; 2) Goal difference; 3) Matches won; 4) Goals scored; 5) Away goals scored; 6) Head-to-head points; 7) Head-to-head matches won; 8) Head-to-head goal difference; 9) Head-to-head goals scored; 10) Head-to-head away goals scored; 11) Draw.
(C) Champions; (O) Play-off winners; (R) Relegated

=== Results ===
==== Games 1–22 ====
Home \ Away	AKT	AST	ATY	IRT	KRT	KSR	OKZ	ORD	SHA	TAR	TOB	ZHE
Aktobe	—	2–3	2–0	2–1	1–3	1–3	0–2	0–3	2–2	2–3	0–1	1–2
Astana	4–1	—	3–1	0–1	0–2	4–1	2–1	2–1	1–2	4–0	2–1	1–0
Atyrau	1–1	0–3	—	1–3	2–1	1–3	1–2	1–0	0–0	1–1	0–1	2–1
Irtysh Pavlodar	0–1	0–4	1–0	—	0–2	0–1	2–1	0–2	0–0	2–0	0–2	0–3
Kairat	3–0	0–1	2–0	2–1	—	5–1	4–1	0–1	2–1	2–0	0–1	0–0
Kaisar	0–1	0–0	0–1	2–0	2–1	—	0–1	0–0	2–2	1–1	5–1	0–1
Okzhetpes	4–0	1–1	3–0	1–0	1–2	1–2	—	0–0	2–2	3–1	1–2	0–1
Ordabasy	1–0	3–2	1–1	1–0	0–0	1–2	3–0	—	3–0	3–0	0–0	1–0
Shakhter Karagandy	3–0	1–0	1–1	4–0	1–2	0–1	1–0	1–2	—	1–0	0–1	2–0
Taraz	1–1	2–0	2–0	0–0	0–1	1–2	2–6	1–0	1–2	—	0–1	2–0
Tobol	2–1	0–2	3–0	3–0	3–5	0–2	2–0	1–1	2–0	4–1	—	0–0
Zhetysu	1–1	0–2	0–0	4–0	3–0	1–0	5–1	1–1	2–0	1–0	0–1	—

Source: soccerway.com
Legend: Blue = home team win; Yellow = draw; Red = away team win.

==== Games 23–33 ====
Home \ Away	AKT	AST	ATY	IRT	KRT	KSR	OKZ	ORD	SHA	TAR	TOB	ZHE
Aktobe	—	—	3–2	1–1	—	—	1–2	—	3–2	2–2	—	—
Astana	5–0	—	—	0–2	3–1	3–0	—	—	2–1	5–0	—	—
Atyrau	—	1–4	—	0–3	—	—	2–2	1–3	—	—	—	0–3
Irtysh Pavlodar	—	—	—	—	5–0	2–1	—	—	4–2	1–0	0–0	—
Kairat	6–0	—	2–1	—	—	—	0–1	4–1	—	—	2–0	4–1
Kaisar	1–3	—	0–1	—	0–1	—	1–1	—	—	—	1–1	0–2
Okzhetpes	—	0–1	—	1–0	—	—	—	0–4	—	2–3	—	1–1
Ordabasy	4–1	1–1	—	2–0	—	0–2	—	—	3–2	3–0	—	—
Shakhter Karagandy	—	—	0–1	—	0–4	3–0	2–2	—	—	—	0–1	—
Taraz	—	—	2–2	—	0–2	2–1	—	—	0–0	—	0–5	—
Tobol	2–1	0–1	2–0	—	—	—	1–0	1–2	—	—	—	0–0
Zhetysu	5–0	2–1	—	2–1	—	—	—	0–1	3–2	0–0	—	—

Source: soccerway.com
Legend: Blue = home team win; Yellow = draw; Red = away team win.

== Relegation play-offs ==
15 November 2019 1st leg	Akzhayik	0 – 0	Taraz	Oral
15:00 (UTC+6)		Report		Stadium: Petr Atoyan Stadium; Attendance: 2,500; Referee: Grigory Moskovchenko

18 November 2019 2nd leg	Taraz	3 – 1 (3 – 1 agg.)	Akzhayik	Taraz
15:00 (UTC+6)	Sarsenov 9'; Abzal Taubay 14', 26'	Report	Simčević 28' (o.g.)	Stadium: Central Stadium; Attendance: 1,500; Referee: Grigory Moskovchenko

== Statistics ==
=== Scoring ===
- First goal of the season: Ablaykhan Makhambetov for Zhetysu against Okzhetpes (9 March 2019)

=== Top scorers ===
As of matches played 10 November 2019

Rank	Player	Club	Goals
1	(Croatia) Marin Tomasov	Astana	19
1	(Ukraine) Aderinsola Eseola	Kairat	19
3	(Kazakhstan) Abat Aimbetov	Aktobe	16
3	(Hungary) Márton Eppel	Kairat	16
5	(Brazil) João Paulo	Ordabasy	15
6	(Armenia) Tigran Barseghyan	Kaisar	11
6	(Kazakhstan) Azat Nurgaliev	Tobol	11
8	(Democratic Republic of the Congo) Kule Mbombo	Kaisar	9
8	(Bulgaria) Martin Toshev	Zhetysu	9
10	(Kazakhstan) Toktar Zhangylyshbay	Ordabasy	8
10	(Croatia) Ivan Pešić	Shakhter Karagandy	8
10	(Estonia) Sergei Zenjov	Shakhter Karagandy	8
10	(Georgia (country)) Elguja Lobjanidze	Taraz	8
10	(Togo) Serge Nyuiadzi	Taraz	8
10	(Ivory Coast) Senin Sebai	Tobol	8
10	(Kazakhstan) Bauyrzhan Turysbek	Tobol	8

=== Clean sheets ===
Updated to matches played on 10 November 2019.

Rank	Player	Club	Clean sheets
1	(Azerbaijan) Emil Balayev	Tobol	18
2	(Kazakhstan) Dmytro Nepohodov	Ordabasy	16
3	(Kazakhstan) Stas Pokatilov	Kairat	13
4	(Kazakhstan) Almat Bekbaev	Zhetysu	11
5	(Kazakhstan) Nenad Erić	Astana	10
5	(Kazakhstan) Igor Shatskiy	Shakhter Karagandy	10
7	(Kazakhstan) Aleksandr Grigorenko	Kaisar	6
8	(Kazakhstan) Andrey Shabanov	Zhetysu	5
8	(Kazakhstan) Anton Tsirin	Irtysh Pavlodar	5
10	(Kazakhstan) Yaroslav Baginsky	Okzhetpes	4
10	(Kazakhstan) Mukhammejan Seisen	Taraz	4
10	(Kazakhstan) Alexander Zarutsky	Atyrau	4

== Attendance ==
Attendants who entered with free ticket are not counted.

Pos	Team	Total	High	Low	Average	Change
1	Kairat	104,800	12,000	2,500	6,164	n/a
2	Aktobe	103,700	11,500	200	6,481	n/a
3	FC Ordabasy	73,900	6,500	2,500	4,347	n/a
4	Taraz	63,100	6,500	2,800	3,943	n/a
5	Tobol	60,600	5,500	2,000	3,564	n/a
6	Kaisar	54,800	6,500	1,500	3,223	n/a
7	Astana	54,400	16,200	1,000	3,200	n/a
8	Shakhter Karagandy	50,000	7,000	500	3,125	n/a
9	FC Irtysh Pavlodar	43,600	5,800	1,200	2,725	n/a
10	Zhetysu Taldykorgan	41,500	3,500	1,000	2,441	n/a
11	Atyrau	36,150	4,500	250	2,259	n/a
12	Okzhetpes	33,700	3,000	700	2,106	n/a
	League total	720,250	16,200	200	3,751	n/a

|u=10 November 2019|
