= Deimantas Petravičius =

Lithuanian footballer (born 1995)

Personal information
- Full name: Deimantas Petravičius
- Date of birth: 2 September 1995 (age 31)
- Place of birth: Vilnius, Lithuania
- Height: 1.78 m (5 ft 10 in)
- Position: Winger

Youth career
- –2011: National Football Academy of Lithuania
- 2011–2016: Nottingham Forest

Senior career*
Years	Team	Apps	(Gls)
2016	Nottingham Forest	1	(0)
2016	→ Stevenage (loan)	2	(0)
2016–2017	Zagłębie Lubin	1	(0)
2017–2018	Motherwell	13	(0)
2018–2019	Falkirk	28	(3)
2019–2020	Okzhetpes	5	(0)
2020	Queen of the South	7	(1)
2020–2022	Águilas	31	(11)

International career
2011–2012	Lithuania U17	8	(1)
2012–2013	Lithuania U19	5	(0)
2013–2016	Lithuania U21	3	(0)
2013–2021	Lithuania	24	(1)
- * Club domestic league appearances and goals as of 23:45, 23 June 2022 (UTC)

Deimantas Petravičius (born 2 September 1995) is a Lithuanian professional footballer who plays as a winger. Petravičius has previously played for Nottingham Forest, Stevenage, Zagłębie Lubin, Motherwell, Falkirk, Okzhetpes, Queen of the South, and Águilas.

== Club career ==
After graduating from the National Football Academy of Lithuania, Petravicius signed for Nottingham Forest, then after a loan spell at Stevenage he signed for Zaglebie Lubin.

On 22 August 2017, Petravičius signed for Motherwell on a contract until the end of the 2017–18 season. debuting on 28 October 2017 as a substitute in a 1–0 home defeat versus Hibernian. Petravičius was released by Well in the 2018 close season.

Petravičius then signed a two-year contract with Falkirk before the start of the 2018-19 season.

On 27 June 2019, Petravičius signed for Kazakhstan Premier League club FC Okzhetpes on a contract until the end of the 2019 season. On 30 January 2020, Petravicius returned to Scotland to sign for Dumfries club Queen of the South until the end of the 2019-20 season.

== International career ==
Petravičius made five appearances for Lithuania U19, including three games in the 2013 UEFA European Under-19 Championship.

Petravicius graduated to Lithuania U21, playing three matches with one arriving in the 2013 UEFA European Under-21 Championship, a 3–0 defeat versus Moldova U21.

Petravičius made his debut for the Lithuania national senior team on 18 November 2013 in a friendly versus Moldova and his second appearance was as a substitute during Lithuania's 1–1 friendly draw with Kazakhstan.

== Career statistics ==
=== Club ===
Appearances and goals by club, season and competition
Club	Season	League			National cup (Note: Includes FA Cup, Polish Cup, Scottish Cup, Kazakhstan Cup and Copa del Rey)		League cup (Note: Includes Football League Cup and Scottish League Cup)		Other		Total	
Club	Season	Division	Apps	Goals	Apps	Goals	Apps	Goals	Apps	Goals	Apps	Goals
Nottingham Forest	2015–16	Championship	1	0	0	0	0	0	—		1	0
Stevenage (loan)	2015–16	League Two	2	0	—		—		—		2	0
Zagłębie Lubin	2016–17	Ekstraklasa	1	0	0	0	—		0	0	1	0
Motherwell	2017–18	Scottish Premiership	13	0	1	0	0	0	—		14	0
Falkirk	2018–19	Scottish Championship	28	3	1	0	4	1	2 (Note: Appearance(s) in Scottish Challenge Cup)	0	35	4
Okzhetpes	2019	Kazakhstan Premier League	5	0	—		—		—		5	0
Queen of the South	2019–20	Scottish Championship	7	1	—		—		—		7	1
Águilas	2021–22	Segunda Federación	11	4	1	0	—		0	0	12	4
Career total			68	8	3	0	4	1	2	0	77	9

=== International ===
Appearances and goals by national team and year
National team	Year	Apps	Goals
Lithuania	2013	1	0
Lithuania	2014	1	0
Lithuania	2015	3	0
Lithuania	2016	2	0
Lithuania	2018	4	1
Lithuania	2019	4	0
Lithuania	2020	3	0
Lithuania	2021	6	0
Total		24	1

Scores and results list Lithuania's goal tally first, score column indicates score after each Petravičius goal.

List of international goals scored by Deimantas Petravičius
No.	Date	Venue	Opponent	Score	Result	Competition	Ref.
1	20 November 2018	Partizan Stadium, Belgrade, Serbia	Serbia	1–2	1–4	2018–19 UEFA Nations League C	

== Honours ==
Zagłębie Lubin II

- IV liga Lower Silesia West: 2016–17
