= Sebastijan Antić =

Croatian footballer (born 1992)

Personal information
- Full name: Sebastijan Antić
- Date of birth: 5 November 1992 (age 34)
- Place of birth: Rijeka, Croatia
- Height: 1.86 m (6 ft 1 in)
- Position: Centre-back

Team information
- Current team: NK Vinodol

Youth career
- 2002−2010: Crikvenica

Senior career*
Years	Team	Apps	(Gls)
2010−2013	Crikvenica	52	(3)
2013−2014	Krk	28	(2)
2014	Pomorac	4	(0)
2015−2016	Zavrč	44	(0)
2016−2017	Al-Wehdat	9	(2)
2017−2019	Al-Quwa Al-Jawiya	0	(0)
2019	Atyrau	0	(0)
2019−2020	Orijent 1919	3	(0)
2020	Sahab	0	(0)
2020−2021	Mesaimeer	8	(0)
2021−2022	Ittihad Misurata	0	(0)
2022–2023	Al-Minaa	0	(0)
2023	CSM Focsani	0	(0)
2023–2024	Maziya S&RC	0	(0)
2024−2025	PSMS Medan	16	(0)
2026	Lokomotiva Rijeka	0	(0)
2026–	NK Vinodol	0	(0)
- * Club domestic league appearances and goals as of 03:19, 10 March 2026 (UTC)

Sebastijan Antić (born 5 November 1992) is a Croatian professional footballer who plays as a centre-back NK Vinodol.

== Club career ==
On 7 August 2019 it was confirmed, that Antić had signed with FC Atyrau in Kazakhstan. However, due to problems with getting his players license, he left the club again and signed with HNK Orijent 1919 two weeks later.

In January 2020, Antic joined Sahab SC in Jordan. On 30 September 2020 SILA, a law company, confirmed that FIFA condemned the club to pay to the player outstanding remuneration and compensation for breach of contract.. On 18 September 2020, he joined Al-Mesaimeer SC in Qatar.

In August 2024, he officially signed a contract with Indonesian club PSMS Medan.

== Honours ==
=== Club ===
Al-Quwa Al-Jawiya

- AFC Cup: 2017
