= František Kubík =

Slovak footballer

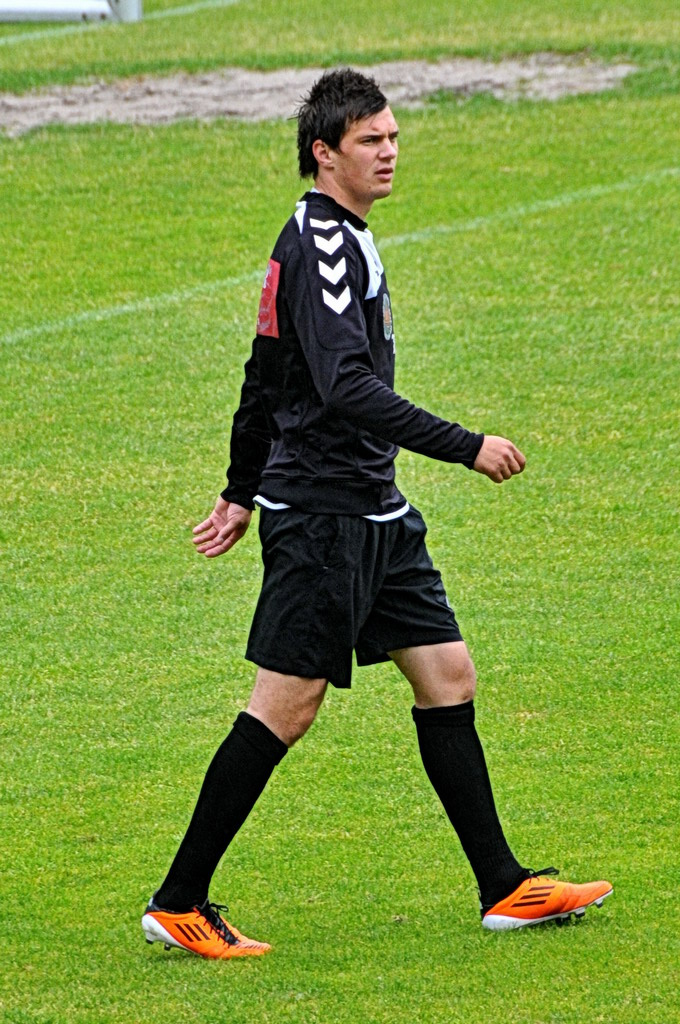

Personal information
- Date of birth: 14 March 1989 (age 37)
- Place of birth: Prievidza, Czechoslovakia
- Height: 1.83 m (6 ft 0 in)
- Positions: Winger; left back

Youth career
- Prievidza

Senior career*
| Years | Team | Apps | (Gls) |
| 2007–2008 | Prievidza | | |
| 2008–2011 | AS Trenčín | 36 | (8) |
| 2010–2011 | → ADO Den Haag (loan) | 31 | (9) |
| 2011 | Kuban Krasnodar | 5 | (0) |
| 2012 | Tavriya Simferopol | 11 | (0) |
| 2012–2013 | AS Trenčín | 19 | (6) |
| 2013 | Arsenal Kyiv | 6 | (0) |
| 2014 | Ergotelis | 10 | (1) |
| 2014 | AS Trenčín | 7 | (3) |
| 2014–2017 | Slovan Bratislava | 82 | (8) |
| 2018 | Žilina | 11 | (1) |
| 2018–2019 | Atyrau | 16 | (0) |
| 2019 | Frýdek-Místek | | |
| 2020 | Petržalka | 1 | (0) |
| 2020–2021 | OFK Lehota pod Vtáčnikom | | (8) |
| 2021 | Petržalka | | |
| 2021–2023 | OFK Lehota pod Vtáčnikom | | |

International career
| 2007–2008 | Slovakia U19 | 9 | (1) |
| 2011–2016 | Slovakia | 3 | (0) |
- * Club domestic league appearances and goals

František Kubík (born 14 March 1989) is a Slovak former footballer who played as a winger or left back.

== Club career ==
Kubík started his career in hometown club HFK Prievidza. In winter 2008, he moved to the Second Division club AS Trenčín. In summer 2009, ADO coach John van den Brom noticed Kubík at pre-season football tournament in the Netherlands. After a year he has signed one-year loan for ADO Den Haag. He made his ADO debut against Vitesse Arnhem on 8 August 2010 and first goal scored against Roda JC on 15 August 2010. He overall scored 9 goals in 2010–11, 8 in Eredivisie and 1 in the European competition play-off.

On 5 June 2011, Kubík signed 4-year contract for Russian club FC Kuban. He made his Kuban debut in a 5–0 win against FC Volga on 21 August 2011. He played for Kuban only 5 matches and was transferred to Ukrainian club SC Tavriya Simferopol on 12 February 2012.

== International career ==
He made his debut for the Slovakia national football team in friendly match against Luxembourg on 9 February 2011.
