= Antun Marković =

Croatian footballer

Personal information
- Full name: Antun Marković
- Date of birth: 4 July 1992 (age 34)
- Place of birth: Gnjilane, FR Yugoslavia
- Height: 1.93 m (6 ft 4 in)
- Position: Goalkeeper

Team information
- Current team: Karlovac (on loan from Slaven Belupo)
- Number: 1

Youth career
- 2005–2006: Voćin
- 2006–2007: Osijek
- 2007–2008: Elektra Osijek
- 2008–2009: Suhopolje
- 2009–2011: Slaven Belupo

Senior career*
Years	Team	Apps	(Gls)
2011–2019	Slaven Belupo	60	(0)
2011–2012	→ Koprivnica (loan)	43	(0)
2013	→ Koprivnica (loan)	14	(0)
2014–2015	→ Slaven Belupo II	20	(0)
2019	Atyrau	10	(0)
2020	Slaven Belupo	0	(0)
2020–2021	Papuk Orahovica	8	(0)
2021	Rot-Weiß Erfurt	0	(0)
2021–	Slaven Belupo	14	(0)
2024–	→ Karlovac (loan)	9	(0)
- * Club domestic league appearances and goals as of 26 April 2024

Antun Marković (Croatian pronunciation: [ǎntuːn mǎːrkoʋitɕ]; born 4 July 1992) is a Croatian footballer who plays as a goalkeeper for Karlovac, on loan from Slaven Belupo.

== Club career ==
=== Atyrau ===
On 19 July 2019, Marković joined Kazakhstan Premier League side Atyrau. Two days later, he made his debut in a 1–0 home win against Ordabasy after being named in the starting line-up.

=== Return to Slaven Belupo ===
On 30 June 2020, Marković signed a one-month contract with Croatian First League club Slaven Belupo. His return came after the resumption of league matches which remained in half due to the COVID-19 pandemic, but he failed to debut with the team as it was the third choice.

=== Papuk Orahovica ===
On 21 August 2020, Marković joined Croatian Third League side Papuk Orahovica. Eight days later, he made his debut in a 1–1 away draw against Tehničar after being named in the starting line-up.

=== Rot-Weiß Erfurt ===
On 1 February 2021, Marković joined with NOFV-Oberliga Süd club Rot-Weiß Erfurt after signed a short-term deal until the end of the 2021–22 season.

=== Second return to Slaven Belupo ===
On 9 July 2021, Marković signed a two-year contract with Croatian First League club Slaven Belupo. Seven days later, he was named as a first team substitute for the first time in a league match against Dinamo Zagreb. His debut with Slaven Belupo came on 20 May 2022 in a 3–1 away defeat against Istra 1961 after being named in the starting line-up.

== International career ==
Marković was born in Gjilan, FR Yugoslavia and raised in Voćin, Croatia to Kosovo Croats parents. On 22 May 2017, he received a call-up from Croatia for the friendly match against Mexico, he was an unused substitute in that match. In addition to Croatia, he has the right to represent his homeland, Kosovo at the international level.

== Career statistics ==
=== Club ===
As of 19 August 2022

Appearances and goals by club, season and competition
Club	Season	League			Cup		Other		Total	
Club	Season	Division	Apps	Goals	Apps	Goals	Apps	Goals	Apps	Goals
Slaven Belupo	2011–12	Croatian First League	0	0	0	0	—		0	0
Koprivnica (loan)	2011–12	Croatian Third League	30	0	0	0	—		30	0
Koprivnica (loan)	2012–13	Croatian Third League	13	0	3	0	—		16	0
Koprivnica (loan)	2013–14	Croatian Third League	14	0	0	0	—		14	0
Koprivnica (loan)	Total		57	0	3	0	—		60	0
Slaven Belupo	2014–15	Croatian First League	0	0	0	0	—		0	0
Slaven Belupo	2015–16	Croatian First League	1	0	0	0	—		1	0
Slaven Belupo	2016–17	Croatian First League	12	0	0	0	—		12	0
Slaven Belupo	2017–18	Croatian First League	35	0	2	0	—		37	0
Slaven Belupo	2018–19	Croatian First League	12	0	0	0	—		12	0
Slaven Belupo	Total		60	0	2	0	—		62	2
Atyrau	2019	Kazakhstan Premier League	10	0	1	0	—		11	0
Slaven Belupo	2019–20	Croatian First League	0	0	0	0	—		0	0
Papuk Orahovica	2020–21	Croatian Third League	8	0	0	0	—		8	0
Rot-Weiß Erfurt	2020–21	NOFV-Oberliga Süd	0	0	0	0	—		0	0
Rot-Weiß Erfurt	Total		18	0	1	0	—		19	0
Slaven Belupo	2021–22	Croatian Football League	1	0	0	0	—		1	0
Slaven Belupo	2022–23	Croatian Football League	4	0	0	0	—		4	0
Slaven Belupo	Total		5	0	0	0	—		5	0
Career total			140	0	6	0	—		146	0
