= Jacques Alberto Ngwem =

Cameroonian footballer

Alberto Ngwem
Personal information
- Full name: Jacques Alberto Ngwem
- Date of birth: 3 August 1992 (age 34)
- Place of birth: Douala, Cameroon
- Height: 1.79 m (5 ft 10 in)
- Position: Midfielder

Team information
- Current team: AER Afantou

Senior career*
Years	Team	Apps	(Gls)
2009–2012	San Roque	3	(0)
2012–2013	Fokikos	31	(1)
2013–2014	Kissamikos		
2014–2015	Atromitos	0	(0)
2015	→ Chania (loan)	9	(0)
2015	Lamia	12	(0)
2016–2017	Kissamikos	32	(1)
2017–2018	Asteras Amaliada	18	(1)
2018–2019	Volos	20	(0)
2019	Atyrau	11	(0)
2020–2021	Kallithea	14	(0)
2021–2024	Almyros Gazi	59	(0)
2024–2025	Panionios	8	(0)
2025–2026	Nea Ionia	0	(0)
2026–	AER Afantou	0	(0)
- * Club domestic league appearances and goals as of 3 August 2026

Jacques Alberto Ngwem (born 3 August 1992) is a Cameroonian professional footballer who plays as a midfielder for Gamma Ethniki club AER Afantou.

== Club career ==
In 2025, Ngwem signed a contract with Greek Gamma Ethniki club Nea Ionia. In the summer transfer window of the following year he left the club to join AER Afantou.
