= Vitali Ustinov =

Russian footballer (born 1991)

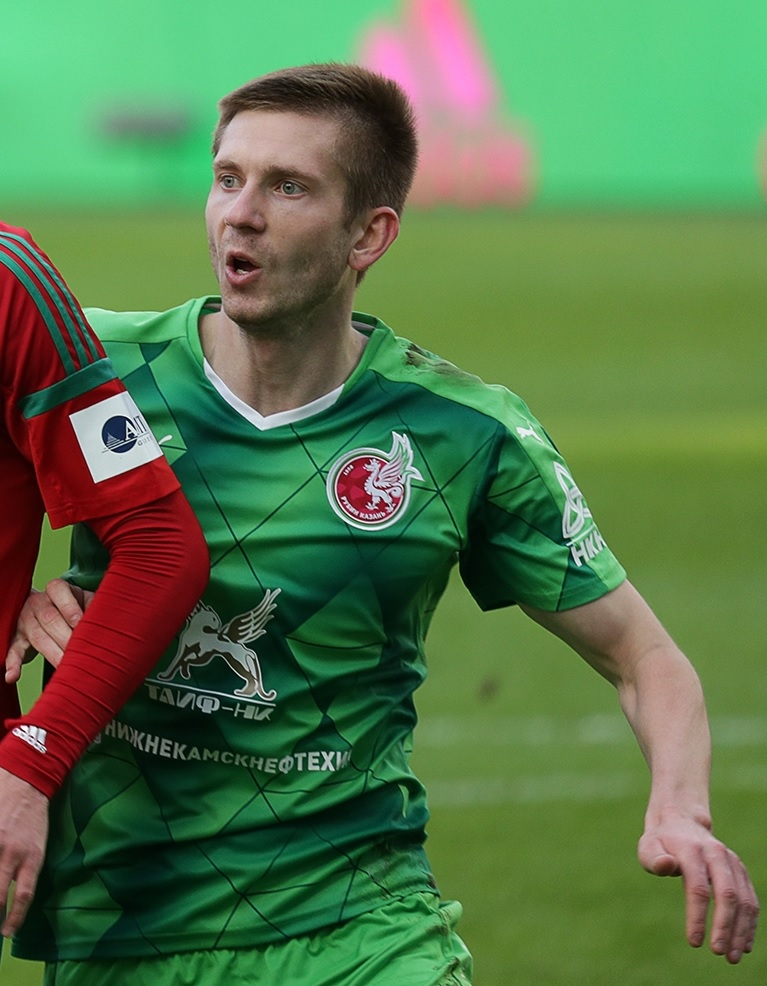
- Ustinov with Rubin in 2016

Personal information
- Full name: Vitali Yuryevich Ustinov
- Date of birth: 3 May 1991 (age 35)
- Place of birth: Moscow, Soviet Union
- Height: 1.82 m (5 ft 11 1/2 in)
- Position: Defender

Youth career
- –2009: Moscow
- 2010: Rubin Kazan

Senior career*
Years	Team	Apps	(Gls)
2011–2013	Rubin Kazan	0	(0)
2011–2013	→ Neftekhimik Nizhnekamsk (loan)	61	(1)
2013–2014	Rotor Volgograd	25	(0)
2014–2019	Rubin Kazan	38	(0)
2014–2015	→ Rubin-2 Kazan	12	(1)
2017	→ Rostov (loan)	14	(1)
2019	Atyrau	6	(0)
2020–2022	Torpedo-BelAZ Zhodino	81	(0)
2023–2024	Alashkert	31	(3)
2024	Volga Ulyanovsk	13	(0)
2024–2025	Sokol Kazan	22	(2)
2025–2026	Irtysh Omsk	25	(2)

International career^{‡}
2010	Russia U19	2	(0)
2012	Russia U21	1	(0)
- * Club domestic league appearances and goals as of 13 June 2026 ‡ National team caps and goals as of 15 August 2012

Vitali Yuryevich Ustinov (Russian: Виталий Юрьевич Устинов; born 3 May 1991) is a Russian professional footballer who plays as a right-back or left-back.

== Club career ==
Ustinov made his debut in the Russian Second Division for Neftekhimik Nizhnekamsk on 24 April 2011 in a game against Volga Ulyanovsk.

On 3 June 2019, he left Rubin Kazan upon the expiration of his contract.

On 23 August 2019, Ustinov signed with the Kazakhstan Premier League club Atyrau.

On 14 January 2023, Alashkert announced the signing of Ustinov. On 12 January 2024, Alashkert announced the departure of Ustinov.

== Career statistics ==
As of 8 June 2024

Club	Season	League			Cup		Continental		Other		Total	
Club	Season	Division	Apps	Goals	Apps	Goals	Apps	Goals	Apps	Goals	Apps	Goals
Neftekhimik Nizhnekamsk (loan)	2011–12	Russian Second League	37	1	3	0	–		–		40	1
Neftekhimik Nizhnekamsk (loan)	2012–13	Russian First League	24	0	1	0	–		3 (Note: Appearances in the FNL Cup)	1	28	1
Neftekhimik Nizhnekamsk (loan)	Total		61	1	4	0	0	0	3	1	68	2
Rotor Volgograd	2013–14	Russian First League	25	0	3	0	–		–		28	0
Rubin Kazan	2014–15	Russian Premier League	1	0	0	0	–		–		1	0
Rubin Kazan	2015–16	Russian Premier League	8	0	0	0	3 (Note: Appearances in the UEFA Europa League)	1	–		11	1
Rubin Kazan	2016–17	Russian Premier League	7	0	2	0	–		–		9	0
Rubin Kazan	2017–18	Russian Premier League	2	0	–		–		–		2	0
Rubin Kazan	2018–19	Russian Premier League	20	0	3	0	–		–		23	0
Rubin Kazan	2019–20	Russian Premier League	0	0	–		–		–		0	0
Rubin Kazan	Total		38	0	5	0	3	1	0	0	46	1
Rubin-2 Kazan	2014–15	Russian Second League	12	1	–		–		–		12	1
Rostov (loan)	2017–18	Russian Premier League	14	1	1	0	–		–		15	1
Atyrau	2019	Kazakhstan Premier League	6	0	0	0	–		–		6	0
Torpedo-BelAZ Zhodino	2020	Belarusian Premier League	29	0	4	0	–		–		33	0
Torpedo-BelAZ Zhodino	2021	Belarusian Premier League	25	0	3	0	2 (Note: Appearances in the UEFA Europa Conference League)	0	–		30	0
Torpedo-BelAZ Zhodino	2022	Belarusian Premier League	27	0	4	0	–		–		31	0
Torpedo-BelAZ Zhodino	Total		81	0	11	0	2	0	0	0	94	0
Alashkert	2022–23	Armenian Premier League	15	2	–		–		–		15	2
Alashkert	2023–24	Armenian Premier League	16	1	0	0	4	2	–		20	3
Alashkert	Total		31	3	0	0	4	2	0	0	35	5
Volga Ulyanovsk	2023–24	Russian Second League A	13	0	–		–		–		13	0
Career total			281	6	24	0	9	3	3	1	317	10
