= Piotr Grzelczak =

Polish footballer (born 1988)

Personal information
- Full name: Piotr Grzelczak
- Date of birth: 2 March 1988 (age 38)
- Place of birth: Łódź, Poland
- Height: 1.88 m (6 ft 2 in)
- Position: Forward

Team information
- Current team: Barycz Sułów
- Number: 9

Youth career
- –2006: Widzew Łódź

Senior career*
Years	Team	Apps	(Gls)
2006–2012	Widzew Łódź	98	(17)
2006	→ KKS Koluszki (loan)	10	(3)
2008–2009	→ Pelikan Łowicz (loan)	32	(18)
2012–2015	Lechia Gdańsk	80	(11)
2012–2015	Lechia Gdańsk II	9	(3)
2013	→ Polonia Warsaw (loan)	11	(1)
2015–2016	Jagiellonia Białystok	31	(6)
2015	Jagiellonia Białystok II	31	(6)
2016–2017	Górnik Łęczna	32	(6)
2017–2018	Platanias	14	(1)
2018–2019	Chojniczanka Chojnice	21	(2)
2019–2022	Atyrau	63	(16)
2023–	Barycz Sułów	109	(79)
- * Club domestic league appearances and goals as of 08:58, 26 June 2026 (UTC)

Piotr Grzelczak (born 2 March 1988) is a Polish professional footballer who plays as a forward for III liga club Barycz Sułów. Besides Poland, he has played in Greece and Kazakhstan.

== Career ==
On 30 July 2013, his team Lechia Gdańsk played in a friendly game against FC Barcelona. Grzelczak scored a goal in the eventual 2–2 draw against the Spanish giants.

On 23 August 2019, FC Atyrau announced the signing of Grzelczak.

== Career statistics ==
As of match played 30 May 2026

Appearances and goals by club, season and competition
Club	Season	League			National cup (Note: Includes Polish Cup, Greek Cup, Kazakhstan Cup)		Europe		Other		Total	
Club	Season	Division	Apps	Goals	Apps	Goals	Apps	Goals	Apps	Goals	Apps	Goals
Widzew Łódź	2006–07	Ekstraklasa	12	0	1	0	—		2 (Note: Appearances in Ekstraklasa Cup)	1	15	1
Widzew Łódź	2007–08	Ekstraklasa	13	0	2	2	—		6	2	21	4
Widzew Łódź	2009–10	I liga	32	7	2	2	—		—		34	9
Widzew Łódź	2010–11	Ekstraklasa	26	8	3	1	—		—		29	9
Widzew Łódź	2011–12	Ekstraklasa	15	2	2	1	—		—		17	3
Widzew Łódź	Total		98	17	10	6	—		8	3	116	26
Pelikan Łowicz (loan)	2008–09	II liga	32	18	1	0	—		—		33	18
Lechia Gdańsk	2011–12	Ekstraklasa	10	1	0	0	—		—		10	1
Lechia Gdańsk	2012–13	Ekstraklasa	6	0	0	0	—		—		6	0
Lechia Gdańsk	2013–14	Ekstraklasa	35	7	4	0	—		—		39	7
Lechia Gdańsk	2014–15	Ekstraklasa	29	3	1	1	—		—		30	4
Lechia Gdańsk	Total		80	11	5	1	—		—		85	12
Lechia Gdańsk II	2012–13	III liga, gr. D	5	3	—		—		—		5	3
Lechia Gdańsk II	2013–14	III liga, gr. D	1	0	—		—		—		1	0
Lechia Gdańsk II	2014–15	III liga, gr. D	3	0	—		—		—		3	0
Lechia Gdańsk II	Total		9	3	—		—		—		9	3
Polonia Warsaw (loan)	2012–13	Ekstraklasa	11	1	0	0	—		—		11	1
Jagiellonia Białystok	2015–16	Ekstraklasa	31	6	2	0	2 (Note: Appearances in UEFA Europa League)	0	—		35	6
Jagiellonia Białystok II	2015–16	III liga, gr. B	2	0	—		—		—		2	0
Górnik Łęczna	2016–17	Ekstraklasa	32	6	1	0	—		—		33	6
Platanias	2017–18	Super League Greece	14	1	3	0	—		—		17	1
Chojniczanka Chojnice	2018–19	I liga	21	2	—		—		—		21	2
Atyrau	2019	Kazakhstan Premier League	8	4	1	1	—		—		9	5
Atyrau	2020	Kazakhstan First Division	12	5	0	0	—		—		12	5
Atyrau	2021	Kazakhstan Premier League	22	5	6	2	—		—		28	7
Atyrau	2022	Kazakhstan Premier League	21	2	6	1	—		—		27	3
Atyrau	Total		63	16	13	4	—		—		76	20
Barycz Sułów	2022–23	IV liga Lower Silesia	9	7	—		—		—		9	7
Barycz Sułów	2023–24	IV liga Lower Silesia	33	20	—		—		—		33	20
Barycz Sułów	2024–25	IV liga Lower Silesia	34	24	—		—		2 (Note: Appearances in IV liga promotion play-offs)	0	36	24
Barycz Sułów	2025–26	IV liga Lower Silesia	31	28	—		—		—		31	28
Barycz Sułów	Total		107	79	—		—		2	0	109	79
Career total			471	160	31	11	2	0	10	3	514	174

== Honours ==
Widzew Łódź

- I liga: 2009–10

Barycz Sułów

- IV liga Lower Silesia: 2025–26
- Polish Cup (Lower Silesia regionals): 2023–24
- Polish Cup (Wrocław regionals): 2023–24, 2024–25

Individual

- II liga East top scorer: 2008–09
- Ekstraklasa Player of the Month: May 2011
