= Darko Bjedov =

Serbian footballer

Personal information
- Full name: Darko Bjedov
- Date of birth: 28 March 1989 (age 37)
- Place of birth: Knin, SR Croatia, SFR Yugoslavia
- Height: 1.91 m (6 ft 3 in)
- Position: Centre forward

Senior career*
Years	Team	Apps	(Gls)
2007–2008	Železničar Beograd	2	(0)
2008	→ Radnički Beograd (loan)	11	(3)
2008–2009	Radnički Beograd	20	(4)
2009–2011	Radnički Obrenovac	51	(16)
2011–2012	Čukarički	9	(2)
2012	→ Mladenovac (loan)	6	(0)
2012–2013	Timok	30	(2)
2014–2015	Inđija	39	(8)
2015–2016	Zeta	33	(18)
2016	Javor Ivanjica	20	(10)
2017–2018	Gent	3	(0)
2018	→ Rad (loan)	14	(4)
2018	Vojvodina	8	(0)
2019	Atyrau	14	(2)
2019	Rad	14	(1)
2020–2021	Zob Ahan	32	(10)
2021–2022	Radnik Surdulica	13	(0)
2022	Zob Ahan		
2023	Khujand	9	(4)
2023	Zvezdara		
2025–2026	Rad	16	(8)
- * Club domestic league appearances and goals as of 15 July 2025

Darko Bjedov (Serbian Cyrillic: Дарко Бједов; born 28 March 1989) is a Serbian footballer who plays as a centre forward.

== Club career ==
Born in Knin, Bjedov started his career with Železničar Beograd. Later he played member of several Belgrade clubs, Radnički, Čukarički and Mladenovac. He was fully affirmed playing with Timok and Inđija in the Serbian First League. After a season with Zeta in the 2015–16 Montenegrin First League, where he was second scorer with 18 goals in 33 matches, Bjedov joined Javor Ivanjica. After he scored 10 goals on 20 Serbian SuperLiga matches during the first half of 2016–17 Serbian SuperLiga season, Bjedov signed a two-and-a-half-year deal with KAA Gent on 9 January 2017. In February 2018, Bjedov joined Rad, on loan deal from Gent, until the end of the 2017–18 Serbian SuperLiga campaign. On 27 August 2018, Bjedov signed a two-year deal with Vojvodina.
