= Serhiy Zahynaylov =

Ukrainian footballer (born 1991)

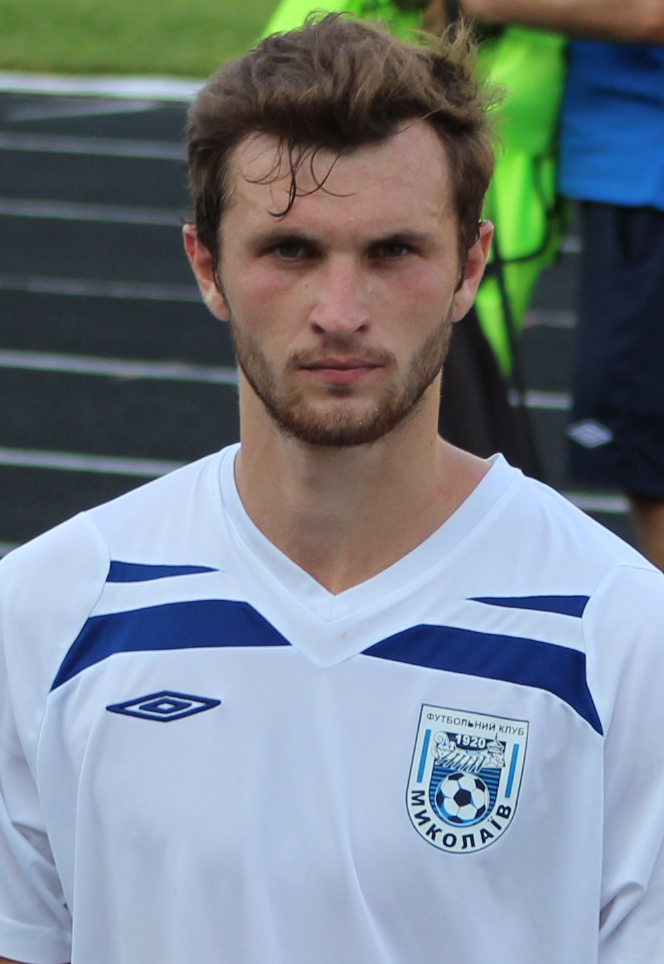

Personal information
- Full name: Serhiy Hennadiyovych Zahynaylov
- Date of birth: 3 January 1991 (age 35)
- Place of birth: Brovary, Soviet Union (now Ukraine)
- Height: 1.81 m (5 ft 11 in)
- Position: Centre-forward

Youth career
- 2005–2006: BVUFK Brovary
- 2008: Zenit Boyarka

Senior career*
Years	Team	Apps	(Gls)
2008–2014	Metalist Kharkiv	0	(0)
2013	→ Helios Kharkiv (loan)	10	(0)
2013–2014	→ Nyva Ternopil (loan)	24	(3)
2014	Mykolaiv	17	(6)
2015–2016	Dacia Chișinău	26	(11)
2016	Torpedo-BelAZ Zhodino	17	(1)
2017	Naftovyk-Ukrnafta Okhtyrka	9	(2)
2017	Zaria Bălți	12	(5)
2018	Riga	5	(2)
2018	Sumy	9	(0)
2019	Atyrau	14	(0)
2019–2022	Alians Lypova Dolyna	56	(20)
2022	Bayern Hof	13	(1)

International career^{‡}
2006–2007	Ukraine U16	11	(0)
2007–2008	Ukraine U17	14	(3)
- * Club domestic league appearances and goals as of 27 November 2022 ‡ National team caps and goals as of 22 March 2015

Serhiy Hennadiyovych Zahynaylov (Ukrainian: Сергій Геннадійович Загинайлов; born 3 January 1991) is a Ukrainian professional footballer who plays as a centre-forward.

== Football career ==
Zahynaylov is a product of Youth Sportive Schools in Kyiv Oblast, then he spent his career played for different Ukrainians club and in February 2015 signed a contract with Moldovan club Dacia Chișinău.

In summer 2022 he moved to Bayern Hof a club in Germany, that also acquired Vadym Zhuk from Desna Chernihiv.

== Honours ==
Metalist Kharkiv

- Ukrainian Premier League: Runner-Up 2012–13

Riga

- Latvian First League: 2018
