= Islamnur Abdulavov =

Russian professional football player

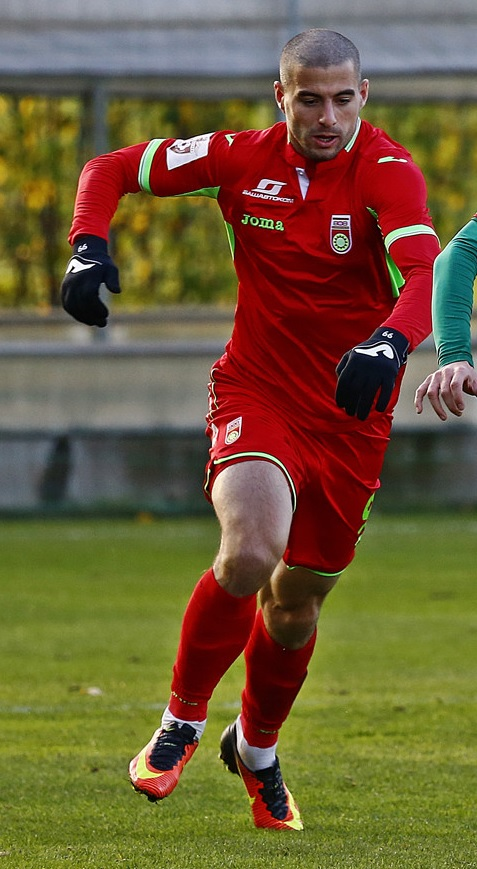
- Abdulavov with FC Ufa in 2016

Personal information
- Full name: Islamnur Magomedrasulovich Abdulavov
- Date of birth: 7 March 1994 (age 32)
- Place of birth: Makhachkala, Russia
- Height: 1.80 m (5 ft 11 in)
- Position: Forward

Youth career
- 2003–2010: RSDYuSShOR Makhachkala
- 2010–2011: Dynamo Kyiv
- 2011–2013: Anzhi Makhachkala

Senior career*
Years	Team	Apps	(Gls)
2013–2016	Anzhi Makhachkala	39	(3)
2016–2018	Ufa	20	(0)
2018	→ Tom Tomsk (loan)	12	(1)
2018	→ Rotor Volgograd (loan)	20	(1)
2019	Tom Tomsk	12	(0)
2019	Atyrau	13	(5)
2020	Okzhetpes	10	(0)
2021–2022	Legion Dynamo	15	(2)
- * Club domestic league appearances and goals

Islamnur Magomedrasulovich Abdulavov (Russian: Исламнур Магомедрасулович Абдулавов; born 7 March 1994) is a Russian former professional football player.

== Early life ==
Islamnur was born in the village of Paraul, Dagestan, to a Kumyk family.

== Club career ==
He made his debut in the Russian Premier League on 17 August 2013 for FC Anzhi Makhachkala in a game against FC Zenit St. Petersburg.

Abdulavov joined Premier League side FC Ufa but after failing to feature regularly at the club, he was sent out on loan to FNL sides FC Tom Tomsk and FC Rotor Volgograd. Abdulavov scored just one goal in 20 league appearances for Rotor, and he refused to join the club's second team, FC Rotor-2 Volgograd, so Ufa recalled him at the beginning of February 2019.

On 8 February 2019, Abdulavov signed with FC Tom Tomsk until the end of the 2018–19 season.

On 3 July 2019, Abdulavov signed with FC Atyrau, scoring on his debut against FC Zhetysu on 6 July 2019.

== Career statistics ==
=== Club ===
As of match played 4 November 2020

Club	Season	League			Cup		Continental		Other		Total	
Club	Season	Division	Apps	Goals	Apps	Goals	Apps	Goals	Apps	Goals	Apps	Goals
Anzhi Makhachkala	2011–12	Russian Premier League	0	0	0	0	–		–		0	0
Anzhi Makhachkala	2012–13	Russian Premier League	0	0	0	0	0	0	–		0	0
Anzhi Makhachkala	2013–14	Russian Premier League	9	1	0	0	6	0	–		15	1
Anzhi Makhachkala	2014–15	FNL	11	1	1	1	–		–		12	2
Anzhi Makhachkala	2015–16	Russian Premier League	19	1	0	0	–		2 (Note: Two appearances in relegation play-offs)	0	21	1
Anzhi Makhachkala	Total		39	3	1	1	6	0	2	0	48	4
Ufa	2016–17	Russian Premier League	13	0	1	0	–		–		14	0
Ufa	2017–18	Russian Premier League	7	0	1	1	–		–		8	1
Ufa	Total		20	0	2	1	0	0	0	0	22	1
Tom Tomsk (loan)	2017–18	FNL	12	1	–		–		–		12	1
Rotor Volgograd	2018–19	FNL	20	1	–		–		–		20	1
Tom Tomsk	2018–19	FNL	12	0	–		–		–		12	0
Atyrau	2019	Kazakhstan Premier League	13	5	1	0	–		–		14	5
Okzhetpes	2020	Kazakhstan Premier League	10	0	0	0	–		–		10	0
Career total			126	10	4	2	6	0	2	0	138	12
