= Miloš Vidović =

Serbian footballer

Personal information
- Full name: Miloš Vidović
- Date of birth: 3 October 1989 (age 37)
- Place of birth: Kragujevac, SR Serbia, SFR Yugoslavia
- Height: 1.86 m (6 ft 1 in)
- Position: Midfielder

Team information
- Current team: Borac 1926
- Number: 29

Youth career
- Radnički Kragujevac
- Šumadija 1903

Senior career*
Years	Team	Apps	(Gls)
2007–2008	Šumadija 1903		
2008–2013	Olimpik Sarajevo	106+	(10+)
2014–2017	RNK Split	85	(2)
2017–2019	Slaven Belupo	63	(5)
2019	Shakhter Karagandy	13	(0)
2020–2024	Radnički 1923	106	(8)
2024–	Borac 1926	50	(0)
- * Club domestic league appearances and goals as of 14 May 2026

Miloš Vidović (Serbian Cyrillic: Милош Видовић; born 3 October 1989) is a Serbian professional footballer who plays as a midfielder for Borac 1926.

== Club career ==
Vidović started his career with FK Šumadija 1903 in his native Kragujevac, playing a season for the senior side before moving on to Olimpik Sarajevo in Bosnia and Herzegovina. He played for the club between 2009 and 2014, making 104 appearances and scoring 10 times. In January 2014, he was transferred to Croatian club RNK Split for three years.

On 27 June 2019, Vidović signed for FC Shakhter Karagandy.

Since 2020. he is president of Belgrade municipality Savski venac.
