= Ivica Žunić =

Croatian footballer (born 1988)

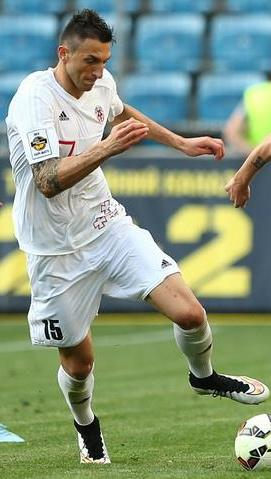

Personal information
- Date of birth: 11 September 1988 (age 38)
- Place of birth: Jajce, SR Bosnia and Herzegovina, SFR Yugoslavia
- Height: 1.95 m (6 ft 5 in)
- Position: Centre-back

Youth career
- NK Elektrobosna Jajce

Senior career*
Years	Team	Apps	(Gls)
2006–2007	HNK Tomislav Tomislavgrad	?	(?)
2008	1. Simmeringer SC	10	(0)
2008–2009	SV Markt Sankt Martin	15	(4)
2009	→ SV Donau Langenlebarn (loan)	14	(2)
2010	Austria Wien II	16	(2)
2010–2011	SV Mattersburg II	27	(5)
2011–2012	Stegersbach	22	(1)
2012–2014	GKS Tychy	46	(4)
2014–2016	Volyn Lutsk	51	(7)
2016–2017	Orenburg	2	(0)
2017–2018	Chornomorets Odesa	23	(0)
2019	Atyrau	18	(2)
2019–2020	Gabala	17	(2)
2020	CFR Cluj	1	(0)
2021	Rapid București	3	(0)
2022	1. Wiener Neustädter		
2022	ASK-BSC Bruck/Leitha		
- * Club domestic league appearances and goals

Ivica Žunić (born 11 September 1988) is a Croatian former professional footballer who played as a centre-back.

== Club career ==
=== Volyn Lutsk ===
On 24 July 2014, Žunić joined Ukrainian club Volyn Lutsk.

=== Orenburg ===
On 6 July 2016, Žunić signed for Russian Premier League newcomers FC Orenburg.

=== Chornomorets Odesa ===
On 18 August 2017, Žunić joined Ukrainian club Chornomorets Odesa.

=== Gabala ===
On 19 July 2019, Žunić signed six-month contract with Gabala.

=== CFR Cluj ===
On 22 November 2020, joined Romanian club CFR Cluj. He made his debut on the same day the Romanian club announced his signing, coming on as a substitute for Ciobotariu in the 87th minute in a 0–1 lose over UTA Arad.

=== Rapid București ===
On 12 January 2021, Rapid București announced the signing of Žunić from CFR Cluj on a one-and-a-half-year contract.
