= Okzhetpes Stadium =

Sportsstadium in Kazakhstan

Coordinates: 53°17′7″N 69°23′30″E

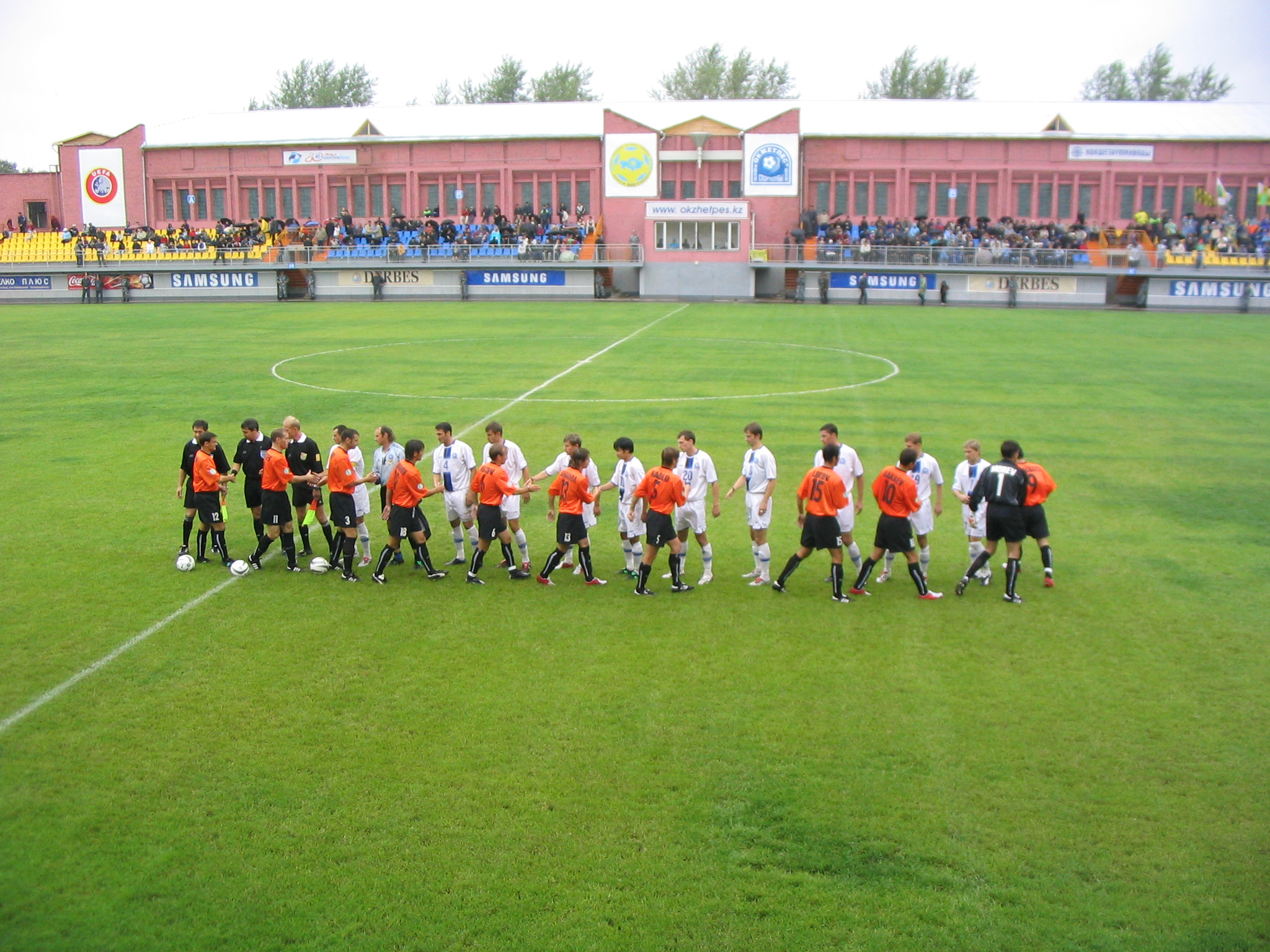
- Interactive map of Okzhetpes Stadium
- Location: Kokshetau, Kazakhstan
- Owner: Municipality of Kokshetau
- Capacity: 4,158
- Surface: Grass; 110m x 72m

Tenant
- FC Okzhetpes

Okzhetpes Stadium is a multi-purpose stadium in Kokshetau, Kazakhstan. It is currently used mostly for football matches and is the home stadium of FC Okzhetpes of the Kazakhstan Premier League. The stadium opened in 1955.

== Features ==
The stadium has a capacity for 4,158 spectators.
