= Milan Stojanović (Serbian footballer) =

Serbian footballer

Personal information
- Date of birth: 10 May 1988 (age 38)
- Place of birth: Leskovac, SFR Yugoslavia
- Height: 1.84 m (6 ft 0 in)
- Position: Right midfielder

Senior career*
Years	Team	Apps	(Gls)
2004–2006	Vlasina	54	(3)
2007	Lokeren	2	(0)
2008–2009	Bežanija	29	(3)
2009–2010	Vlasina	17	(7)
2010–2011	Radnik Surdulica		
2011–2012	Radnički Svilajnac	27	(8)
2012–2015	Sloga Petrovac	83	(27)
2015	Borac Banja Luka	13	(0)
2016–2017	Metalac Gornji Milanovac	36	(7)
2017–2018	Shakhter Karagandy	41	(10)
2018	Radnik Surdulica	13	(3)
2019–2020	Okzhetpes	47	(8)
2021	Turan	9	(0)
2022	Okzhetpes	21	(3)
2023	Radnik Surdulica	9	(0)
- * Club domestic league appearances and goals as of 27 December 2023

Milan Stojanović (Serbian Cyrillic: Милан Стојановић; born 10 May 1988) is a Serbian professional footballer who plays as a right midfielder.

== Career ==
On 26 January 2018, Stojanović extended his contract with Shakhter Karagandy. On 18 January 2019, he returned to Kazakhstan, signing for FC Okzhetpes.
