= 2017–18 FC Rubin Kazan season =

Rubin Kazan
2017–18 season
- Chairman: Ilsur Metshin
- Manager: Kurban Berdyev
- Stadium: Kazan Arena
- Russian Premier League: 10th
- Russian Cup: Round of 16 vs Krylia Sovetov
- Top goalscorer: League: Sardar Azmoun (5); All: Sardar Azmoun (5)
Home colours	Away colours	Third colours

The 2017–18 FC Rubin Kazan season was the fifteenth successive season that Rubin Kazan played in the Russian Premier League, the highest tier of association football in Russia. Rubin finished the season in tenth position, and were knocked out of the Russian Cup at the Round of 16 stage by Krylia Sovetov.

== Squad ==
As of 2 March 2018 Note: Flags indicate national team as defined under FIFA eligibility rules; some limited exceptions apply. Players may hold more than one non-FIFA nationality.

No.	Pos.	Nation	Player
1	GK	RUS	Sergei Ryzhikov
2	DF	RUS	Oleg Kuzmin (Captain)
7	MF	RUS	Vyacheslav Podberyozkin (on loan from Krasnodar)
8	MF	CMR	Alex Song
14	DF	RUS	Vladimir Granat
15	MF	RUS	Igor Konovalov
16	GK	RUS	Timur Akmurzin
18	MF	RUS	Pavel Mogilevets
19	DF	RUS	Vitali Ustinov
26	MF	ROU	Gabriel Enache
28	GK	RUS	Aleksandr Filtsov
30	DF	RUS	Fyodor Kudryashov

No.	Pos.	Nation	Player
33	FW	IRI	Sardar Azmoun
35	GK	RUS	Soslan Dzhanayev
44	DF	ESP	César Navas
61	MF	TUR	Gökdeniz Karadeniz
66	MF	ECU	Christian Noboa (on loan from Zenit St. Petersburg)
71	MF	BUL	Ivelin Popov (on loan from Spartak Moscow)
77	MF	IRI	Reza Shekari
80	DF	RUS	Yegor Sorokin
85	MF	RUS	Ilzat Akhmetov
88	MF	RUS	Ruslan Kambolov
96	FW	RUS	Rifat Zhemaletdinov

=== Out on loan ===
Note: Flags indicate national team as defined under FIFA eligibility rules; some limited exceptions apply. Players may hold more than one non-FIFA nationality.

No.	Pos.	Nation	Player
—	DF	SWE	Emil Bergström (at Grasshoppers until 30 June 2018)
—	DF	RUS	Sergei Doronin (at Neftekhimik Nizhnekamsk until 30 June 2018)
—	DF	ESP	Sergio Sánchez (at Espanyol until 30 June 2018)
—	MF	BEL	Maxime Lestienne (at Málaga until 30 June 2018)

No.	Pos.	Nation	Player
—	MF	RUS	Georgi Makhatadze (at SKA-Khabarovsk until 30 June 2018)
—	FW	RUS	Dmitri Kamenshchikov (at Neftekhimik Nizhnekamsk until 30 June 2018)
—	FW	ESP	Rubén Rochina (at Levante until 30 June 2018)

=== Reserves ===
Note: Flags indicate national team as defined under FIFA eligibility rules; some limited exceptions apply. Players may hold more than one non-FIFA nationality.

No.	Pos.	Nation	Player
12	DF	RUS	Aleksei Karnaukhov
16	GK	RUS	Timur Akmurzin
29	DF	RUS	Ruslan Shcherbin
36	MF	RUS	Maksim Bobrovskiy
38	GK	RUS	Yegor Tushev
47	DF	RUS	Dmitri Gubanov
48	MF	RUS	Artur Nikolayev
53	FW	RUS	Nikita Goldobin
54	FW	RUS	Daniil Makeyev
56	FW	RUS	Gevorg Arutyunyan
62	MF	RUS	Artur Kovalik

No.	Pos.	Nation	Player
64	DF	RUS	Kirill Lukyanchikov
73	MF	RUS	Igor Nikolov
82	DF	RUS	Nikita Mikhailov
87	FW	RUS	Artur Alukayev
89	MF	RUS	Mikhail Yakovlev
92	MF	RUS	Almaz Sharafeev
93	MF	RUS	Ilya Gilyazutdinov
94	DF	RUS	Ilya Shabanov
98	GK	RUS	Anton Chernov
—	GK	RUS	Fyodor Arsentyev

== Transfers ==
=== Summer ===
In: Note: Flags indicate national team as defined under FIFA eligibility rules; some limited exceptions apply. Players may hold more than one non-FIFA nationality.

No.	Pos.	Nation	Player
5	DF	ISL	Ragnar Sigurðsson (on loan from (England) Fulham)
14	DF	RUS	Vladimir Granat (from (Russia) Rostov)
27	MF	RUS	Magomed Ozdoyev (end of loan to (Russia) Akhmat Grozny)
28	GK	RUS	Aleksandr Filtsov (end of loan to (Russia) Anzhi Makhachkala)
30	DF	RUS	Fyodor Kudryashov (from (Russia) Rostov)
33	FW	IRI	Sardar Azmoun (from (Russia) Rostov)
35	GK	RUS	Soslan Dzhanayev (from (Russia) Rostov)
42	DF	RUS	Amir Gavrilov
44	DF	ESP	César Navas (from (Russia) Rostov)
45	FW	RUS	Kamil Mullin (end of loan to (Russia) Neftekhimik Nizhnekamsk)
46	MF	RUS	Albert Sharipov (end of loan to (Russia) Neftekhimik Nizhnekamsk)
56	FW	RUS	Gevorg Arutyunyan (end of loan to (Armenia) Pyunik)
80	DF	RUS	Yegor Sorokin (end of loan to (Russia) Neftekhimik Nizhnekamsk)
—	MF	IRI	Reza Shekari (from (Iran) Zob Ahan)
—	MF	RUS	Albert Sharipov (end of loan to (Russia) Neftekhimik Nizhnekamsk)
—	FW	RUS	Kamil Mullin (end of loan to (Russia) Neftekhimik Nizhnekamsk)

Out: Note: Flags indicate national team as defined under FIFA eligibility rules; some limited exceptions apply. Players may hold more than one non-FIFA nationality.

No.	Pos.	Nation	Player
6	DF	ESP	Sergio Sánchez (loan to (Spain) Espanyol)
14	MF	RUS	Diniyar Bilyaletdinov
15	FW	RUS	Nikita Saprunov
19	MF	RUS	Vladimir Sobolev
22	FW	BRA	Jonathas (to (Germany) Hannover 96)
31	MF	RUS	Denis Tkachuk (to (Russia) Krylia Sovetov Samara)
32	DF	RUS	Anatoli Brendelev
33	MF	RUS	Inal Getigezhev (to (Russia) Orenburg)
37	MF	RUS	Adil Mukhametzyanov (to (Russia) Anzhi-Yunior Zelenodolsk)
39	FW	RUS	Vladimir Dyadyun (to (Russia) Rostov)
40	DF	RUS	Danis Giniyatullin
41	DF	RUS	Sergei Doronin (on loan to (Russia) Neftekhimik Nizhnekamsk)
49	DF	RUS	Vitali Ustinov (on loan to (Russia) Rostov)
51	MF	RUS	Nikita Kulalayev
57	MF	RUS	Iskander Badriyev
63	MF	RUS	Alisher Dzhalilov (to (Russia) Baltika Kaliningrad)
65	MF	RUS	Erik Vasilyev
78	FW	RUS	Nikita Torgashov (to (Russia) Neftekhimik Nizhnekamsk)
80	MF	RUS	Vladislav Kulik (to (Russia) Orenburg)
91	GK	RUS	Yuri Nesterenko
97	FW	RUS	Dmitri Kamenshchikov
—	GK	RUS	Fyodor Arsentyev (to (Russia) Neftekhimik Nizhnekamsk, previously on loan)
—	DF	URU	Guillermo Cotugno (to (Spain) Real Oviedo, previously on loan to (Argentina) Talleres)
—	DF	GEO	Mamuka Kobakhidze (to (Georgia (country)) Locomotive Tbilisi, previously on loan to (Russia) Neftekhimik Nizhnekamsk)
—	DF	GEO	Solomon Kvirkvelia (to (Russia) Lokomotiv Moscow, previously on loan)
—	FW	ESP	Samu (to (Spain) Levante, previously on loan to (Spain) Leganés)

=== Winter ===
In: Note: Flags indicate national team as defined under FIFA eligibility rules; some limited exceptions apply. Players may hold more than one non-FIFA nationality.

No.	Pos.	Nation	Player
7	MF	RUS	Vyacheslav Podberyozkin (on loan from (Russia) Krasnodar)
15	MF	RUS	Igor Konovalov (from (Russia) Kuban Krasnodar)
19	DF	RUS	Vitali Ustinov (end of loan to (Russia) Rostov)
18	MF	RUS	Pavel Mogilevets (from (Russia) Rostov)
26	MF	ROU	Gabriel Enache (from (Romania) Steaua București)
41	DF	RUS	Vladislav Mikushin
49	MF	RUS	Aleksandr Tsiberkin (from own academy)
43	DF	RUS	Grigori Ziganshin (from (Russia) Krasnodar-3)
50	DF	RUS	Rail Abdullin
51	DF	RUS	Ilya Agapov
58	MF	RUS	Timur Lobanov
59	MF	RUS	Nikita Makarov
60	DF	RUS	Amir Nurullin
63	FW	RUS	Nikita Saprunov
65	FW	RUS	Artur Sagitov
66	MF	ECU	Christian Noboa (on loan from (Russia) Zenit St. Petersburg)
67	DF	RUS	Aleksandr Smelov
69	DF	RUS	Danil Stepanov
71	FW	BUL	Ivelin Popov (on loan from (Russia) Spartak Moscow)
72	FW	RUS	Nikita Tsygankov
75	MF	RUS	Nikita Torgashov (end of loan to (Russia) Neftekhimik Nizhnekamsk)

Out: Note: Flags indicate national team as defined under FIFA eligibility rules; some limited exceptions apply. Players may hold more than one non-FIFA nationality.

No.	Pos.	Nation	Player
3	DF	RUS	Elmir Nabiullin (to (Russia) Zenit St. Petersburg)
4	MF	FRA	Yann M'Vila (to (France) Saint-Étienne)
5	DF	ISL	Ragnar Sigurðsson (end of loan from (England) Fulham)
9	FW	RUS	Maksim Kanunnikov
10	MF	BEL	Maxime Lestienne (on loan to (Spain) Málaga)
20	MF	CRO	Mijo Caktaš (to (Croatia) Hajduk Split)
21	FW	ESP	Rubén Rochina (on loan to (Spain) Levante)
23	DF	AUT	Moritz Bauer (to (England) Stoke City)
27	MF	RUS	Magomed Ozdoyev (to (Russia) Zenit St. Petersburg)
29	MF	RUS	Ruslan Shcherbin (on loan to (Russia) KAMAZ Naberezhnye Chelny)
45	FW	RUS	Kamil Mullin (to (Russia) Tyumen)
70	MF	RUS	Georgi Makhatadze (on loan to (Russia) SKA-Khabarovsk)
90	DF	RUS	Taras Burlak (to (Russia) Krylia Sovetov Samara)
91	GK	RUS	Yuri Nesterenko (to (Russia) Yenisey Krasnoyarsk)
—	DF	PER	Carlos Zambrano (to (Ukraine) Dynamo Kyiv)
—	DF	UKR	Andriy Pylyavskyi

== Competitions ==
=== Russian Premier League ===
==== Results by round ====
Round	1	2	3	4	5	6	7	8	9	10	11	12	13	14	15	16	17	18	19	20	21	22	23	24	25	26	27	28	29	30
Ground	H	A	H	A	H	A	H	H	A	H	A	H	A	H	A	H	A	H	A	H	A	A	H	A	H	A	H	A	H	A
Result	L	L	W	W	D	D	W	W	L	L	L	L	W	D	L	D	D	L	L	W	D	W	L	D	W	W	D	D	D	D
Position	11	13	9	7	9	8	6	5	6	6	9	10	10	7	10	10	10	12	12	11	11	8	9	9	8	8	9	9	11	10

Updated to match(es) played on 13 May 2018. Source: See Results
A = Away; H = Home; W = Win; D = Draw; L = Loss

==== Results ====
16 July 2017 1	Rubin Kazan	1 – 2	Krasnodar	Kazan
17:30 MSK (UTC+3)	Granat (yellow card) 45'; Lestienne 72'; Kudryashov (yellow card) 84'; Ozdoyev (yellow card) 86'	Report	Granqvist (yellow card) 12'; Laborde 17', 23'; Ramírez (yellow card) 77'	Stadium: Kazan Arena; Attendance: 11,934; Referee: Evgeny Turbin

22 July 2017 2	Zenit St.Petersburg	2 – 1	Rubin Kazan	Saint Petersburg
17:30 MSK (UTC+3)	Driussi 51', 90+1'	Report	Nabiullin (yellow card) 14'; Zhemaletdinov 45+1'; Karadeniz (yellow card) 73'	Stadium: Krestovsky Stadium; Attendance: 38,284; Referee: Vladimir Seldyakov

29 July 2017 3	Rubin Kazan	2 – 1	Arsenal Tula	Kazan
17:30 MSK (UTC+3)	Granat (yellow card) 51'; Song 60'; Caktaš 74' (pen.); Kambolov (yellow card) 86'	Report	Shevchenko 34' (yellow card) 65'; Aleksandrov (yellow card) 58'	Stadium: Kazan Arena; Attendance: 7,220; Referee: Vladimir Moskalyov

6 August 2017 4	CSKA Moscow	1 – 2	Rubin Kazan	Moscow
17:30 MSK (UTC+3)	Shchennikov 13'; Wernbloom (yellow card) 26'; Vitinho (yellow card) 32'	Report	Jonathas 2', 10'; Granat (yellow card) 23'; M'Vila (yellow card) 56'; Ryzhikov (yellow card) 90+3'	Stadium: VEB Arena; Attendance: 11,165; Referee: Vladislav Bezborodov

9 August 2017 5	Rubin Kazan	1 – 1	Lokomotiv Moscow	Kazan
20:00 MSK (UTC+3)	Azmoun (yellow card) 36'; Jonathas (yellow card) 36' (yellow-red card) 52'; Zhemaletdinov 62' (pen.); Ryzhikov (yellow card) 90+3'	Report	Al.Miranchuk (yellow card) 36'; Denisov (yellow card) 51'; Barinov (yellow card) 61'; Ignatyev (yellow card) 84'; Kvirkvelia 90+2'	Stadium: Kazan Arena; Attendance: 14,095; Referee: Aleksey Sukhoy

13 August 2017 6	SKA-Khabarovsk	1 – 1	Rubin Kazan	Khabarovsk
11:00 MSK (UTC+3)	Dedechko (yellow card) 79'; Hristov 82'; Kazankov (yellow card) 90'	Report	Bauer (yellow card) 75'; Caktaš 90+2'	Stadium: Lenin Stadium; Attendance: 11,230; Referee: Aleksei Nikolaev

19 August 2017 7	Rubin Kazan	6 – 0	Anzhi Makhachkala	Kazan
20:00 MSK (UTC+3)	Jonathas 4', 31'; Karadeniz 15'; Bauer (yellow card) 60'; Nabiullin 62'; M'Vila 85'; Lestienne 86'	Report	Bagayev (yellow card) 10'	Stadium: Kazan Arena; Attendance: 11,252; Referee: Sergei Karasev

26 August 2017 8	Rubin Kazan	1 – 0	Tosno	Kazan
17:30 MSK (UTC+3)	Kanunnikov 19'; Kudryashov (yellow card) 61'; Ozdoyev (yellow card) 64'; Azmoun (yellow card) 71'	Report	Kazayev (yellow card) 39'; Markov (yellow card) 61'	Stadium: Kazan Arena; Attendance: 10,136; Referee: Artem Chistyakov

9 September 2017 9	Spartak Moscow	1 – 0	Rubin Kazan	Moscow
19:00 MSK (UTC+3)	Promes (yellow card) 17' (goal) 48'; Popov (yellow card) 20'; Yeshchenko (yellow card) 39'; Kutepov (yellow card) 73'	Report	Sigurðsson (yellow card) 34'	Stadium: Otkrytiye Arena; Attendance: 28,781; Referee: Sergey Lapochkin

17 September 2017 10	Rubin Kazan	0 – 1	Ural Yekaterinburg	Kazan
16:30 MSK (UTC+3)	Granat (yellow card) 63'	Report	Chanturia (yellow card) 32'; Bavin (yellow card) 62'; Bicfalvi 87'	Stadium: Kazan Arena; Attendance: 8,325; Referee: Sergei Karasev

25 September 2017 11	Akhmat Grozny	1 – 0	Rubin Kazan	Grozny
19:30 MSK (UTC+3)	Ozdoyev 85' (o.g.); Mbengue (yellow card) 88'; Rodolfo (yellow card) 89'; Gorodov (yellow card) 90+3'	Report		Stadium: Akhmat-Arena; Attendance: 8,345; Referee: Aleksey Sukhoy

30 September 2017 12	Rubin Kazan	0 – 1	Amkar Perm	Kazan
16:30 MSK (UTC+3)	M'Vila (yellow card) 57'; Granat (yellow card) 60'	Report	Miljković (yellow card) 57'; Gol (yellow card) 63' (goal) 83'; Nigmatullin (yellow card) 85'	Stadium: Kazan Arena; Attendance: 5,614; Referee: Mikhail Vilkov

15 October 2017 13	Rostov	0 – 1	Rubin Kazan	Rostov-on-Don
16:30 MSK (UTC+3)	Dyadyun (yellow card) 57'; Ionov (yellow card) 88'	Report	Granat (yellow card) 44'; Nabiullin (yellow card) 59'; M'Vila 67'; Sigurðsson (yellow card) 70'	Stadium: Olimp-2; Attendance: 8,683; Referee: Aleksei Eskov

21 October 2017 14	Rubin Kazan	0 – 0	Dynamo Moscow	Kazan
16:30 MSK (UTC+3)		Report	Sosnin (yellow card) 57'; Morozov (yellow card) 90+1'	Stadium: Kazan Arena; Attendance: 5,878; Referee: Kirill Levnikov

30 October 2017 15	Ufa	2 – 1	Rubin Kazan	Ufa
17:00 MSK (UTC+3)	Stotsky 36'; Salatić (yellow card) 42'; Vaněk (yellow card) 67' (goal) 89'; Abdulavov (yellow card) 74'; Zhivoglyadov (yellow card) 82'	Report	Karadeniz 3'; Bauer (yellow card) 88'	Stadium: Neftyanik Stadium; Attendance: 4,612; Referee: Sergey Ivanov

5 November 2017 16	Rubin Kazan	0 – 0	Zenit St.Petersburg	Kazan
19:00 MSK (UTC+3)	Granat (yellow card) 24'; Bauer (yellow card) 54'; M'Vila (yellow card) 61'; Azmoun (yellow card) 90+5'	Report	Paredes (yellow card) 72'; Smolnikov (yellow card) 90+5'	Stadium: Kazan Arena; Attendance: 11,007; Referee: Roman Galimov

18 November 2017 17	Arsenal Tula	0 – 0	Rubin Kazan	Tula
19:00 MSK (UTC+3)	Gorbatenko (yellow card) 29'; Khagush (yellow card) 45'	Report	Kudryashov (yellow card) 43'	Stadium: Arsenal Stadium; Attendance: 9,688; Referee: Vladimir Seldyakov

26 November 2017 18	Rubin Kazan	0 – 1	CSKA Moscow	Kazan
14:00 MSK (UTC+3)	Granat (yellow card) 90+2'	Report	Wernbloom 45+1'; Khosonov (yellow card) 75'; Natkho (penalty missed) 90+2'	Stadium: Kazan Arena; Attendance: 8,422; Referee: Sergey Ivanov

2 December 2017 19	Lokomotiv Moscow	1 – 0	Rubin Kazan	Moscow
16:30 MSK (UTC+3)	Farfán 87'; Tarasov (yellow card) 88'	Report	Navas (yellow card) 46' (red card) 80'; Ozdoyev (yellow card) 90+4'	Stadium: RZD Arena; Attendance: 11,551; Referee: Sergey Lapochkin

9 December 2017 20	Rubin Kazan	3 – 1	SKA-Khabarovsk	Kazan
16:30 MSK (UTC+3)	Nabiullin (yellow card) 8'; Kudryashov (yellow card) 15'; Sorokin (yellow card) 20'; Azmoun 25'; Kanunnikov 40'; Ozdoyev 49'; Caktaš (yellow card) 63'	Report	Dimidko (yellow card) 38'; Maksimenko 74'	Stadium: Kazan Arena; Attendance: 3,112; Referee: Igor Fedotov

2 March 2018 21	Anzhi Makhachkala	1 – 1	Rubin Kazan	Kaspiysk
19:30 MSK (UTC+3)	Tetrashvili (yellow card) 33'; Budkivskyi (yellow card) 64'; Samardžić (yellow card) 80'; Lescano 90+1'	Report	Kambolov (yellow card) 18'; Popov 36'; Mogilevets (yellow card) 37'; Kuzmin (yellow card) 55'; Noboa (yellow card) 77'	Stadium: Anzhi Arena; Attendance: 4,500; Referee: Aleksey Eskov

10 March 2018 22	Tosno	0 – 1	Rubin Kazan	Saransk
19:00 MSK (UTC+3)		Report	Enache (yellow card) 18'; Podberyozkin 75'; Granat (yellow card) 89'	Stadium: Start Stadium; Attendance: 1,310; Referee: Sergey Karasev
Note: Match moved to Start Stadium in Saransk.

17 March 2018 23	Rubin Kazan	1 – 2	Spartak Moscow	Kazan
19:00 MSK (UTC+3)	Kudryashov (yellow card) 23'; Granat (yellow card) 48'; Noboa 61'	Report	Maksimović (yellow card) 9'; Hanni 18'; Fernando (yellow card) 60'; Luiz Adriano 81'	Stadium: Kazan Arena; Attendance: 14,239; Referee: Vladislav Bezborodov

1 April 2018 24	Ural Yekaterinburg	1 – 1	Rubin Kazan	Yekaterinburg
14:00 MSK (UTC+3)	Bicfalvi (yellow card) 65' (yellow-red card) 88' (goal) 73'; Dimitrov (penalty missed) 73'; Yevseyev (yellow card) 76'; Kulakov (yellow card) 85'	Report	Popov 34'; Navas (yellow card) 64'; Kudryashov (yellow card) 68'	Stadium: SKB-Bank Arena; Attendance: 18,218; Referee: Sergey Ivanov

7 April 2018 25	Rubin Kazan	3 – 2	Akhmat Grozny	Kazan
14:00 MSK (UTC+3)	Kuzmin (yellow card) 23'; Popov 49', 70'; Azmoun 63'; Sorokin (yellow card) 80'; Karadeniz (yellow card) 90+4'	Report	Mitrishev 1', 86'; Semyonov (yellow card) 10'; Mohammadi (yellow card) 55'; Ángel (yellow card) 62'	Stadium: Kazan Arena; Attendance: 3,099; Referee: Aleksei Matyunin

14 April 2018 26	Amkar Perm	0 – 3	Rubin Kazan	Perm
11:30 MSK (UTC+3)	Ogude (yellow card) 24'; Bodul (yellow card) 62'	Report	Azmoun 24', 39' (yellow card) 45+1'; Sorokin (yellow card) 56'; Kuzmin 77'	Stadium: Zvezda Stadium; Attendance: 5,768; Referee: Igor Fedotov

21 April 2018 27	Rubin Kazan	1 – 1	Rostov	Kazan
16:30 MSK (UTC+3)	Noboa 40'	Report	Parshivlyuk 67'	Stadium: Kazan Arena; Attendance: 5,820; Referee: Vladislav Bezborodov

30 April 2018 28	Dynamo Moscow	0 – 0	Rubin Kazan	Khimki
14:00 MSK (UTC+3)	Rausch (yellow card) 26'; Markov (yellow card) 56'	Report	Kuzmin (yellow card) 17'; Popov (yellow card) 35'; Podberyozkin (yellow card) 58'	Stadium: Arena Khimki; Attendance: 6,415; Referee: Vitaly Meshkov

7 May 2018 29	Rubin Kazan	0 – 0	Ufa	Kazan
19:30 MSK (UTC+3)	Kuzmin (yellow card) 54'; Kudryashov (yellow card) 57'	Report	Stotsky (yellow card) 61'	Stadium: Kazan Arena; Attendance: 25,440; Referee: Aleksei Matyunin

13 May 2018 30	Krasnodar	1 – 1	Rubin Kazan	Krasnodar
14:00 MSK (UTC+3)	Wanderson (yellow card) 43'; Pereyra (yellow card) 48'; Mamayev 56' (yellow card) 56'; Smolov (yellow card) 61'	Report	Kambolov (yellow card) 45+2'; Azmoun 87'	Stadium: Krasnodar Stadium; Attendance: 34,055; Referee: Sergey Ivanov

==== League table ====
Pos	Team	Pld	W	D	L	GF	GA	GD	Pts
8	Dynamo Moscow	30	10	10	10	29	30	−1	40
9	Akhmat Grozny	30	10	9	11	30	34	−4	39
10	Rubin Kazan	30	9	11	10	32	25	+7	38
11	Rostov	30	9	10	11	27	28	−1	37 (Note: Head-to-head: Rostov 1–0 Ural, Ural 1–1 Rostov)
12	Ural Yekaterinburg	30	8	13	9	31	32	−1	37

Updated to match(es) played on 13 May 2018. Source: Russian Premier League, Soccerway
Rules for classification: 1) Points; 2) Head-to-head points; 3) Head-to-head matches won; 4) Head-to-head goal difference; 5) Head-to-head goals scored; 6) Head-to-head away goals; 7) Matches won; 8) Goal difference; 9) Goals scored; 10) Away goals scored.

=== Russian Cup ===
20 September 2017 Round of 32	Orenburg	0 – 2	Rubin Kazan	Orenburg
15:00 MSK (UTC+3)		Report	Sorokin 29'; Dzhanayev (yellow card) 84'; Lestienne 90+4'	Stadium: Gazovik Stadium; Attendance: 4,284; Referee: Aleksei Matyunin

25 October 2017 Round of 16	Rubin Kazan	1 – 2	Krylia Sovetov	Kazan
19:00 MSK (UTC+3)	Zhemaletdinov 59'; Lestienne (yellow card) 68'	Report	Kornilenko (yellow card) 19' (goal) 33'; Aliyev 55'	Stadium: Kazan Arena; Attendance: 3,411; Referee: Igor Fedotov

== Squad statistics ==
As of Match played 13 May 2018

=== Appearances and goals ===
No.	Pos	Nat	Player	Total		Premier League		Russian Cup	
No.	Pos	Nat	Player	Apps	Goals	Apps	Goals	Apps	Goals
1	GK	(Russia) RUS	Sergei Ryzhikov	14	0	12+1	0	1	0
2	DF	(Russia) RUS	Oleg Kuzmin	12	1	9+2	1	1	0
7	MF	(Russia) RUS	Vyacheslav Podberyozkin	7	1	7	1	0	0
14	DF	(Russia) RUS	Vladimir Granat	28	0	26+1	0	1	0
15	MF	(Russia) RUS	Igor Konovalov	7	0	6+1	0	0	0
18	MF	(Russia) RUS	Pavel Mogilevets	8	0	7+1	0	0	0
19	DF	(Russia) RUS	Vitali Ustinov	2	0	1+1	0	0	0
26	MF	(Romania) ROU	Gabriel Enache	5	0	5	0	0	0
30	DF	(Russia) RUS	Fyodor Kudryashov	28	0	26	0	2	0
33	FW	(Iran) IRI	Sardar Azmoun	28	5	13+13	5	2	0
35	GK	(Russia) RUS	Soslan Dzhanayev	19	0	18	0	1	0
44	DF	(Spain) ESP	César Navas	17	0	17	0	0	0
61	MF	(Turkey) TUR	Gökdeniz Karadeniz	21	2	10+11	2	0	0
66	MF	(Ecuador) ECU	Christian Noboa	10	2	10	2	0	0
71	MF	(Bulgaria) BUL	Ivelin Popov	9	4	9	4	0	0
77	MF	(Iran) IRI	Reza Shekari	2	0	0+2	0	0	0
80	MF	(Russia) RUS	Yegor Sorokin	19	1	11+6	0	2	1
85	MF	(Russia) RUS	Ilzat Akhmetov	3	0	1+2	0	0	0
88	MF	(Russia) RUS	Ruslan Kambolov	21	0	18+2	0	1	0
96	FW	(Russia) RUS	Rifat Zhemaletdinov	23	3	11+10	2	1+1	1
Players away from the club on loan:
6	DF	(Spain) ESP	Sergio Sánchez	1	0	1	0	0	0
21	MF	(Spain) ESP	Rubén Rochina	5	0	3+1	0	0+1	0
Players who left Rubin Kazan during the season:
3	DF	(Russia) RUS	Elmir Nabiullin	15	1	14	1	1	0
4	MF	(France) FRA	Yann M'Vila	20	2	19	2	1	0
5	DF	(Iceland) ISL	Ragnar Sigurðsson	13	0	11+1	0	1	0
8	MF	(Cameroon) CMR	Alex Song	7	1	2+4	1	1	0
9	FW	(Russia) RUS	Maksim Kanunnikov	17	2	14+1	2	1+1	0
10	MF	(Belgium) BEL	Maxime Lestienne	12	3	4+6	2	1+1	1
20	MF	(Croatia) CRO	Mijo Caktaš	10	2	6+4	2	0	0
22	FW	(Brazil) BRA	Jonathas	5	4	4+1	4	0	0
23	DF	(Austria) AUT	Moritz Bauer	18	0	15+1	0	1+1	0
27	MF	(Russia) RUS	Magomed Ozdoyev	21	1	19	1	2	0
90	DF	(Russia) RUS	Taras Burlak	2	0	1	0	1	0

=== Goal scorers ===
Place	Position	Nation	Number	Name	Premier League	Russian Cup	Total
1	FW	(Iran)	33	Sardar Azmoun	5	0	5
2	FW	(Brazil)	22	Jonathas	4	0	4
2	MF	(Bulgaria)	71	Ivelin Popov	4	0	4
4	MF	(Belgium)	10	Maxime Lestienne	2	1	3
4	FW	(Russia)	96	Rifat Zhemaletdinov	2	1	3
6	MF	(Croatia)	20	Mijo Caktaš	2	0	2
6	MF	(France)	4	Yann M'Vila	2	0	2
6	MF	(Turkey)	61	Gökdeniz Karadeniz	2	0	2
6	FW	(Russia)	9	Maksim Kanunnikov	2	0	2
6	MF	(Ecuador)	66	Christian Noboa	2	0	2
11	MF	(Cameroon)	8	Alex Song	1	0	1
11	DF	(Russia)	3	Elmir Nabiullin	1	0	1
11	MF	(Russia)	27	Magomed Ozdoyev	1	0	1
11	MF	(Russia)	7	Vyacheslav Podberyozkin	1	0	1
11	DF	(Russia)	2	Oleg Kuzmin	1	0	1
11	MF	(Russia)	80	Yegor Sorokin	0	1	1
				TOTALS	32	3	35

=== Disciplinary record ===
Number	Nation	Position	Name	Premier League		Russian Cup		Total	
Number	Nation	Position	Name	Yellow card	Red card	Yellow card	Red card	Yellow card	Red card
1	(Russia)	GK	Sergei Ryzhikov	2	0	0	0	2	0
2	(Russia)	DF	Oleg Kuzmin	4	0	0	0	4	0
7	(Russia)	MF	Vyacheslav Podberyozkin	1	0	0	0	1	0
14	(Russia)	DF	Vladimir Granat	10	0	0	0	10	0
18	(Russia)	MF	Pavel Mogilevets	1	0	0	0	1	0
26	(Romania)	MF	Gabriel Enache	1	0	0	0	1	0
30	(Russia)	DF	Fyodor Kudryashov	7	0	0	0	7	0
33	(Iran)	FW	Sardar Azmoun	4	0	0	0	4	0
35	(Russia)	GK	Soslan Dzhanayev	0	0	1	0	1	0
44	(Spain)	DF	César Navas	2	1	0	0	2	1
61	(Turkey)	MF	Gökdeniz Karadeniz	2	0	0	0	2	0
66	(Ecuador)	MF	Christian Noboa	1	0	0	0	1	0
71	(Bulgaria)	MF	Ivelin Popov	1	0	0	0	1	0
80	(Russia)	MF	Yegor Sorokin	3	0	0	0	3	0
88	(Russia)	MF	Ruslan Kambolov	3	0	0	0	3	0
Players who left Rubin Kazan during the season:
3	(Russia)	DF	Elmir Nabiullin	3	0	0	0	3	0
4	(France)	MF	Yann M'Vila	3	0	0	0	3	0
5	(Iceland)	DF	Ragnar Sigurðsson	2	0	0	0	2	0
10	(Belgium)	MF	Maxime Lestienne	0	0	1	0	1	0
20	(Croatia)	MF	Mijo Caktaš	1	0	0	0	1	0
22	(Brazil)	FW	Jonathas	2	1	0	0	2	1
23	(Austria)	DF	Moritz Bauer	4	0	0	0	4	0
27	(Russia)	MF	Magomed Ozdoyev	3	0	0	0	3	0
			TOTALS	60	2	2	0	62	2
