= 2016–17 FC Rubin Kazan season =

FC Rubin Kazan
2016–17 season
- Chairman: Ilsur Metshin
- Manager: Javi Gracia
- Stadium: Central Stadium; Kazan Arena
- Russian Premier League: 9th
- Russian Cup: Semifinal vs Ural Yekaterinburg
- Top goalscorer: League: Jonathas (9); All: Jonathas (11)
Home colours	Away colours	Third colours

The 2016–17 FC Rubin Kazan season was the 14th successive season that the club played in the Russian Premier League, the highest tier of association football in Russia.

== Season events ==
Before the season kicked off, Rubin Kazan appointed Javi Gracia as their new manager, replacing Valeriy Chaly. He brought new players to the club including Rifat Zhemaletdinov, Alex Song and Sergio Sánchez. Jako replaced Puma as the club`s kit supplier.

== Squad ==
As of 24 February 2017

Note: Flags indicate national team as defined under FIFA eligibility rules; some limited exceptions apply. Players may hold more than one non-FIFA nationality.

No.	Pos.	Nation	Player
1	GK	RUS	Sergei Ryzhikov
2	DF	RUS	Oleg Kuzmin (Captain)
3	DF	RUS	Elmir Nabiullin
4	MF	FRA	Yann M'Vila
6	DF	ESP	Sergio Sánchez
8	MF	CMR	Alex Song
9	FW	RUS	Maksim Kanunnikov
10	MF	BEL	Maxime Lestienne
14	MF	RUS	Diniyar Bilyaletdinov
20	MF	CRO	Mijo Caktaš
21	MF	ESP	Rubén Rochina
22	FW	BRA	Jonathas

No.	Pos.	Nation	Player
23	DF	SUI	Moritz Bauer
25	DF	PER	Carlos Zambrano
31	MF	RUS	Denis Tkachuk
39	FW	RUS	Vladimir Dyadyun
49	DF	RUS	Vitali Ustinov
61	MF	TUR	Gökdeniz Karadeniz
80	MF	RUS	Vladislav Kulik
85	MF	RUS	Ilzat Akhmetov
88	MF	RUS	Ruslan Kambolov
90	DF	RUS	Taras Burlak
91	GK	RUS	Yuri Nesterenko
96	FW	RUS	Rifat Zhemaletdinov

=== Out on loan ===
Note: Flags indicate national team as defined under FIFA eligibility rules; some limited exceptions apply. Players may hold more than one non-FIFA nationality.

No.	Pos.	Nation	Player
5	DF	GEO	Solomon Kvirkvelia (at Lokomotiv Moscow)
13	DF	SWE	Emil Bergström (at Grasshoppers)
27	MF	RUS	Magomed Ozdoyev (at Terek Grozny)
77	MF	ESP	Samu (at Leganés)
—	GK	RUS	Aleksandr Filtsov (at Anzhi Makhachkala)

No.	Pos.	Nation	Player
—	DF	RUS	Maksim Batov (at Anzhi Makhachkala)
—	DF	URU	Guillermo Cotugno (at Talleres until 30 June 2017)
—	DF	UKR	Andriy Pylyavskyi (at Zorya Luhansk)
—	MF	RUS	Albert Sharipov (at Neftekhimik Nizhnekamsk until 30 June 2017)
—	MF	RUS	Vladimir Sobolev (at Neftekhimik Nizhnekamsk until 30 June 2017)

=== Youth squad ===
Note: Flags indicate national team as defined under FIFA eligibility rules; some limited exceptions apply. Players may hold more than one non-FIFA nationality.

No.	Pos.	Nation	Player
16	GK	RUS	Timur Akmurzin
32	DF	RUS	Anatoli Brendelev
33	DF	RUS	Inal Getigezhev
35	DF	RUS	Kirill Lukyanchikov
36	MF	RUS	Maksim Bobrovskiy
37	MF	RUS	Adil Mukhametzyanov
40	DF	RUS	Danis Giniyatullin
41	DF	RUS	Sergei Doronin
47	DF	RUS	Dmitri Gubanov
48	MF	RUS	Artur Nikolayev
51	MF	RUS	Nikita Kulalayev
53	FW	RUS	Nikita Goldobin
54	FW	RUS	Daniil Makeyev
56	FW	RUS	Gevorg Arutyunyan
57	MF	RUS	Iskander Badriyev

No.	Pos.	Nation	Player
62	MF	RUS	Artur Kovalik
63	MF	RUS	Alisher Dzhalilov
70	MF	RUS	Georgi Makhatadze
73	MF	RUS	Igor Nikolov
78	FW	RUS	Nikita Torgashov
81	DF	RUS	Ilnur Safeyev
82	DF	RUS	Nikita Mikhailov
87	FW	RUS	Artur Alukayev
89	MF	RUS	Mikhail Yakovlev
92	MF	RUS	Almaz Sharafeev
93	MF	RUS	Ilya Gilyazutdinov
94	DF	RUS	Ilya Shabanov
97	FW	RUS	Dmitri Kamenshchikov
98	GK	RUS	Anton Chernov

== Transfers ==
=== Summer ===
In: Note: Flags indicate national team as defined under FIFA eligibility rules; some limited exceptions apply. Players may hold more than one non-FIFA nationality.

No.	Pos.	Nation	Player
4	MF	FRA	Yann M'Vila (end of loan to (England) Sunderland)
6	DF	ESP	Sergio Sánchez (from (Greece) Panathinaikos)
8	MF	CMR	Alex Song (from (Spain) Barcelona)
10	MF	BEL	Maxime Lestienne (from (Qatar) Al-Arabi)
21	MF	ESP	Rubén Rochina (from (Spain) Granada)
22	FW	BRA	Jonathas (from (Spain) Real Sociedad)
23	DF	SUI	Moritz Bauer (from (Switzerland) Grasshoppers)
25	DF	PER	Carlos Zambrano (from (Germany) Eintracht Frankfurt)
33	MF	RUS	Inal Getigezhev (end of loan to (Russia) Orenburg)
37	MF	RUS	Adil Mukhametzyanov
51	MF	RUS	Nikita Kulalayev (from (Russia) Lada-Togliatti)
53	FW	RUS	Nikita Goldobin
54	FW	RUS	Daniil Makeyev (from (Russia) Khimki-M)
64	DF	COD	Chris Mavinga (end of loan to (France) ESTAC)
70	MF	RUS	Georgi Makhatadze (from (Russia) Lokomotiv Moscow)
77	MF	ESP	Samu (from (Spain) Villarreal)
80	MF	RUS	Vladislav Kulik (end of loan to (Russia) Kuban Krasnodar)
90	DF	RUS	Taras Burlak (end of loan to (Russia) Krylia Sovetov Samara)
96	FW	RUS	Rifat Zhemaletdinov (from (Russia) Lokomotiv Moscow)

Out: Note: Flags indicate national team as defined under FIFA eligibility rules; some limited exceptions apply. Players may hold more than one non-FIFA nationality.

No.	Pos.	Nation	Player
7	FW	RUS	Igor Portnyagin (to (Russia) Lokomotiv Moscow)
8	DF	RUS	Maksim Batov (on loan to (Russia) Orenburg)
10	MF	BRA	Carlos Eduardo (to (Brazil) Atlético Mineiro)
15	MF	BLR	Syarhey Kislyak (to (Turkey) Gaziantepspor)
21	DF	URU	Guillermo Cotugno (on loan to (Argentina) Talleres)
29	MF	RUS	Shota Bibilov (to (Russia) Olimpiyets Nizhny Novgorod)
30	MF	RUS	Vladimir Sobolev (on loan to (Russia) Neftekhimik Nizhnekamsk)
34	FW	RUS	Timur Khakimov
37	MF	RUS	Aleksei Frolov
39	DF	RUS	Niyaz Valeyev
42	DF	RUS	Amir Gavrilov
43	FW	RUS	Nikita Vorona
46	MF	RUS	Ruslan Kausarov (to (Russia) Kuban-2 Krasnodar)
52	MF	RUS	Rail Idiyatullin
54	MF	RUS	Erik Vasilyev
58	DF	RUS	Nikita Balandin
64	FW	RUS	Nikita Tankov (to (Russia) CRFSO Smolensk)
65	DF	RUS	Maksim Zhestokov (to (Russia) Volgar Astrakhan)
66	DF	RUS	Almaz Gilmutdinov
70	GK	RUS	Yevgeni Shchetinin (to (Russia) Dynamo Kirov)
77	MF	BUL	Blagoy Georgiev (to (Russia) Orenburg)
79	DF	UKR	Andriy Pylyavskyi (on loan to (Ukraine) Vorskla Poltava)
86	FW	RUS	Timur Koblov
95	GK	RUS	Fyodor Arsentyev (on loan to (Russia) Neftekhimik Nizhnekamsk, previously from (Russia) Spartak Moscow)
95	MF	RUS	Insar Salakhetdinov (to (Russia) Sportakademklub Moscow)
96	MF	RUS	German Frolov
—	DF	GEO	Mamuka Kobakhidze (on loan to (Russia) Neftekhimik Nizhnekamsk, previously on loan to (Russia) Mordovia Saransk)
—	DF	URU	Mauricio Lemos (to (Spain) Las Palmas, previously on loan)
—	MF	GHA	Wakaso Mubarak (to (Greece) Panathinaikos, previously on loan to (Spain) Las Palmas)
—	MF	RUS	Ilsur Samigullin (to (Russia) Syzran-2003, previously on loan to (Russia) Neftekhimik Nizhnekamsk)
—	MF	RUS	Albert Sharipov (on loan to (Russia) Neftekhimik Nizhnekamsk, previously on loan to (Russia) Tom Tomsk)
—	FW	IRI	Sardar Azmoun (to (Russia) Rostov, previously on loan)
—	FW	RUS	Sergei Davydov (released, previously on loan to (Russia) KAMAZ Naberezhnye Chelny)
—	FW	CRO	Marko Livaja (to (Spain) Las Palmas, previously on loan to (Italy) Empoli)
—	FW	RUS	Kamil Mullin (on loan to (Russia) Neftekhimik Nizhnekamsk, previously on loan to (Russia) Sokol Saratov)
—	FW	RUS	Dmitri Otstavnov (to (Portugal) Santa Clara, previously on loan to (Russia) Volga Ulyanovsk)

=== Winter ===
In: Note: Flags indicate national team as defined under FIFA eligibility rules; some limited exceptions apply. Players may hold more than one non-FIFA nationality.

No.	Pos.	Nation	Player
12	DF	RUS	Aleksei Karnaukhov
15	FW	RUS	Nikita Saprunov
19	MF	RUS	Vladimir Sobolev (end of loan to (Russia) Neftekhimik Nizhnekamsk)
29	DF	RUS	Ruslan Shcherbin (from (Russia) KAMAZ Naberezhnye Chelny academy)
65	MF	RUS	Erik Vasilyev

Out: Note: Flags indicate national team as defined under FIFA eligibility rules; some limited exceptions apply. Players may hold more than one non-FIFA nationality.

No.	Pos.	Nation	Player
5	DF	GEO	Solomon Kvirkvelia (on loan to (Russia) Lokomotiv Moscow)
11	FW	UKR	Marko Dević (to (Russia) Rostov)
13	DF	SWE	Emil Bergström (on loan to (Switzerland) Grasshoppers)
24	DF	RUS	Yegor Sorokin (to (Russia) Neftekhimik Nizhnekamsk, previously on loan to (Kazakhstan) Aktobe)
27	MF	RUS	Magomed Ozdoyev (on loan to (Russia) Terek Grozny)
64	DF	COD	Chris Mavinga (to (Canada) Toronto)
77	MF	ESP	Samu (on loan to (Spain) Leganés)
83	DF	RUS	Aleksandr Kuznetsov
84	MF	RUS	Andrei Mironov
—	GK	RUS	Aleksandr Filtsov (on loan to (Russia) Anzhi Makhachkala, previously on loan to (Russia) Arsenal Tula)
—	DF	RUS	Maksim Batov (to (Russia) Anzhi Makhachkala, previously on loan to (Russia) Orenburg)
—	DF	UKR	Andriy Pylyavskyi (on loan to (Ukraine) Zorya Luhansk, previously on loan to (Ukraine) Vorskla Poltava)
—	MF	UZB	Bobir Davlatov (to (Russia) Neftekhimik Nizhnekamsk, previously on loan to (Kazakhstan) Aktobe)

== Competitions ==
=== Russian Premier League ===
==== Results by round ====
Round	1	2	3	4	5	6	7	8	9	10	11	12	13	14	15	16	17	18	19	20	21	22	23	24	25	26	27	28	29	30
Ground	H	A	H	H	A	H	A	H	A	H	A	H	A	H	A	H	A	A	H	A	H	A	H	A	H	A	H	A	H	A
Result	D	L	D	L	L	W	L	W	L	W	L	W	W	D	D	W	L	W	D	L	L	D	L	D	L	W	W	L	L	W
Position	9	11	13	13	14	10	12	10	10	9	10	10	8	8	9	8	9	9	9	9	10	10	11	11	11	10	9	9	9	9

Updated to match(es) played on 21 May 2017. Source: See Results
A = Away; H = Home; W = Win; D = Draw; L = Loss

==== Matches ====
1 August 2016 1	Rubin Kazan	0 – 0	Amkar Perm	Kazan
19:30 MSK (UTC+3)	Kanunnikov (yellow card) 14' (yellow-red card) 35'; Nabiullin (yellow card) 45+1'	Summary	Anene (yellow card) 12'; Shynder (yellow card) 69'; Salugin (yellow card) 90+3'	Stadium: Central Stadium; Attendance: 12,178; Referee: Mikhail Vilkov

6 August 2016 2	Arsenal Tula	1 – 0	Rubin Kazan	Tula
19:30 MSK (UTC+3)	Shevchenko 21' (yellow card) 76'	Summary	Sánchez (yellow card) 39'; Burlak (yellow card) 88'; Dević (yellow card) 90+4'	Stadium: Arsenal Stadium; Attendance: 11,500; Referee: Evgeny Turbin

13 August 2016 3	Rubin Kazan	1 – 1	Spartak Moscow	Kazan
20:30 MSK (UTC+3)	Ozdoyev (yellow card) 21'; Dević 45'; Song (yellow card) 82'; Sánchez (yellow card) 90+1'	Summary	Popov 21' (yellow card) 45'; Fernando (yellow card) 71'; Bocchetti (yellow card) 90'	Stadium: Central Stadium; Attendance: 17,339; Referee: Vitali Meshkov

19 August 2016 4	Rubin Kazan	1 – 2	Anzhi Makhachkala	Kazan
19:30 MSK (UTC+3)	Kanunnikov 34'	Summary	Budkivskyi 42'; Ebecilio 54'; Gadzhibekov (yellow card) 69'; Lazić (yellow card) 76'; Gasanov (yellow card) 90+3'	Stadium: Central Stadium; Attendance: 8,572; Referee: Aleksei Eskov

27 August 2016 5	Orenburg	1 – 1	Rubin Kazan	Orenburg
13:00 MSK (UTC+3)	Sanaya (yellow card) 23'; Katsalapov (yellow card) 38'; Yefremov 45+1'; Afonin (yellow card) 66'; Markelov (yellow card) 90+3'	Summary	Bauer (yellow card) 26'; Kanunnikov 90+1'	Stadium: Gazovik Stadium; Attendance: 5,825; Referee: Sergei Karasev

12 September 2016 6	Rubin Kazan	3 – 1	Ural Yekaterinburg	Kazan
19:30 MSK (UTC+3)	Novikov 29' (o.g.); Nabiullin (yellow card) 37'; Tkachuk 70'; Lestienne 76'	Summary	Yemelyanov (yellow card) 18'; Pavlyuchenko (yellow card) 77' (goal) 87'	Stadium: Central Stadium; Attendance: 5,399; Referee: Kirill Levnikov

19 September 2016 7	Zenit St.Petersburg	4 – 1	Rubin Kazan	Saint Petersburg
19:30 MSK (UTC+3)	Criscito 16' (pen.); Mak 53'; Dzyuba (yellow card) 57' (goal) 63'; Giuliano 59'; Đorđević (yellow card) 77'; Smolnikov (yellow card) 88'	Summary	Zambrano (yellow card) 57'; Jonathas 86'; Lestienne (yellow card) 88'	Stadium: Petrovsky Stadium; Attendance: 17,008; Referee: Aleksei Matyunin

26 September 2016 8	Rubin Kazan	2 – 1	Tom Tomsk	Kazan
19:30 MSK (UTC+3)	Jonathas 26'; Kambolov (yellow card) 75' (goal) 79'	Summary	Bicfalvi (yellow card) 19'; Vranješ 49'	Stadium: Central Stadium; Attendance: 4,463; Referee: Sergey Lapochkin

2 October 2016 9	Krasnodar	1 – 0	Rubin Kazan	Krasnodar
19:00 MSK (UTC+3)	Kaboré (yellow card) 28'; Ari (yellow card) 37' (goal) 45+1'	Summary	Zambrano (yellow card) 36'; Nabiullin (yellow card) 39'; Kanunnikov (yellow card) 88'	Stadium: Kuban Stadium; Attendance: 5,200; Referee: Igor Fedotov

15 October 2016 10	Rubin Kazan	3 – 0	Krylia Sovetov	Kazan
17:00 MSK (UTC+3)	Kanunnikov 38'; Bauer (yellow card) 50'; Rochina 52'; Jonathas 53'	Summary	Tkachyov (yellow card) 43'; Taranov (yellow card) 80'; Kornilenko (yellow card) 82'	Stadium: Kazan Arena; Attendance: 9,176; Referee: Artem Chistyakov

22 October 2016 11	Terek Grozny	3 – 1	Rubin Kazan	Grozny
19:30 MSK (UTC+3)	Balaj 18' (yellow card) 87'; Ivanov (yellow card) 60'; Semyonov (yellow card) 61'; Grozav 71' (pen.); Mohammadi (yellow card) 78'; Roshi 90+3' (yellow card) 90+4'	Summary	Jonathas 34'; Caktaš (red card) 60'; Zambrano (yellow card) 69' (yellow-red card) 70'	Stadium: Akhmat-Arena; Attendance: 12,300; Referee: Sergey Lapochkin

31 October 2016 12	Rubin Kazan	2 – 0	Lokomotiv Moscow	Kazan
19:30 MSK (UTC+3)	Bauer (yellow card) 61'; Kanunnikov 69'; Jonathas 77'	Summary	Mykhalyk (yellow card) 13'; Denisov (yellow card) 54'	Stadium: Kazan Arena; Attendance: 8,026; Referee: Vladislav Bezborodov

5 November 2016 13	Ufa	2 – 3	Rubin Kazan	Ufa
13:30 MSK (UTC+3)	Shelia (red card) 8'; Sysuyev 45+2' (yellow card) 82'; Stotsky 49'; Zaseyev (yellow card) 76' (yellow-red card) 86'	Summary	Jonathas 18' (pen.); Rochina 28' (yellow card) 89'; Nabiullin 51'; Burlak (yellow card) 72'; Sánchez (yellow card) 79'	Stadium: Neftyanik Stadium; Attendance: 6,900; Referee: Aleksei Eskov

18 November 2016 14	Rubin Kazan	0 – 0	Rostov	Kazan
19:30 MSK (UTC+3)	Zhemaletdinov (yellow card) 79'	Summary	Gațcan (yellow card) 30'; Navas (yellow card) 58'	Stadium: Kazan Arena; Attendance: 18,971; Referee: Aleksei Nikolaev

26 November 2016 15	CSKA Moscow	0 – 0	Rubin Kazan	Moscow
14:00 MSK (UTC+3)	Shchennikov (yellow card) 46'; Wernbloom (yellow card) 73'	Summary	Sánchez (yellow card) 30'; Rochina (yellow card) 46'; Ryzhikov (yellow card) 90+2'	Stadium: Arena CSKA; Attendance: 8,900; Referee: Aleksandr Egorov

30 November 2016 16	Rubin Kazan	1 – 0	Arsenal Tula	Kazan
19:00 MSK (UTC+3)	Jonathas 62'; Ryzhikov (yellow card) 89'	Summary	Khagush (yellow card) 32'	Stadium: Kazan Arena; Attendance: 3,289; Referee: Vladimir Moskalyov

5 December 2016 17	Spartak Moscow	2 – 1	Rubin Kazan	Moscow
19:30 MSK (UTC+3)	Promes 43' (yellow card) 45+1' (yellow-red card) 76'; Zobnin (yellow card) 69'; Glushakov 74'; Maurício (yellow card) 80'; Popov (yellow card) 81'	Summary	Nabiullin (yellow card) 6' (yellow-red card) 71'; Jonathas 38' (yellow card) 74'; Caktaš (yellow card) 65'	Stadium: Otkrytiye Arena; Attendance: 20,512; Referee: Mikhail Vilkov

6 March 2016 18	Anzhi Makhachkala	0 – 1	Rubin Kazan	Kaspiysk
19:30 MSK (UTC+3)	Ezatolahi (yellow card) 27' (yellow-red card) 77'	Summary	Tkachuk (yellow card) 11'; Kanunnikov (yellow card) 23' (goal) 81'	Stadium: Anzhi Arena; Attendance: 4,950; Referee: Aleksey Eskov

11 March 2017 19	Rubin Kazan	0 – 0	Orenburg	Kazan
16:30 MSK (UTC+3)	Kambolov (yellow card) 15'; Zambrano (yellow card) 30'; Kanunnikov (yellow card) 90'	Summary	Ďuriš (yellow card) 60'; Malykh (yellow card) 74'; Sivakow (yellow card) 78'	Stadium: Kazan Arena; Attendance: 3,459; Referee: Aleksei Matyunin

18 March 2017 20	Ural Yekaterinburg	1 – 0	Rubin Kazan	Yekaterinburg
14:00 MSK (UTC+3)	Ilyin 11'; Bicfalvi (yellow card) 69'; Korobov (yellow card) 83'	Summary	Jonathas (yellow card) 80'	Stadium: SKB-Bank Arena; Attendance: 4,813; Referee: Vitaly Meshkov

2 March 2017 21	Rubin Kazan	0 – 2	Zenit St.Petersburg	Kazan
14:00 MSK (UTC+3)	Kambolov (yellow card) 77'; Nabiullin (yellow card) 88'	Summary	Dzyuba 36'; Danny 40'; Yusupov (yellow card) 49' (yellow-red card) 83'; Lombaerts (yellow card) 62'; Giuliano (yellow card) 65'; Criscito (yellow card) 90+1'	Stadium: Kazan Arena; Attendance: 10,022; Referee: Vladimir Seldyakov

10 April 2017 22	Tom Tomsk	2 – 2	Rubin Kazan	Tomsk
15:00 MSK (UTC+3)	Osipov (yellow card) 8'; Pugin 13'; Sasin (yellow card) 36'; Sobolev 83'	Summary	Lestienne (yellow card) 37' (goal) 47' (pen.), 79'	Stadium: Trud Stadium; Attendance: 3,200; Referee: Artem Chistyakov

15 April 2017 23	Rubin Kazan	0 – 1	Krasnodar	Kazan
19:30 MSK (UTC+3)	Sánchez (yellow card) 60'	Summary	Smolov 57'	Stadium: Kazan Arena; Attendance: 3,041; Referee: Mikhail Vilkov

23 April 2017 24	Krylia Sovetov	0 – 0	Rubin Kazan	Samara
14:30 MSK (UTC+3)	Kornilenko (yellow card) 40'; Bruno (yellow card) 64'	Summary	Bauer (yellow card) 67'; Kambolov (yellow card) 90+4'	Stadium: Metallurg Stadium; Attendance: 7,513; Referee: Vladimir Moskalyov

26 April 2017 25	Rubin Kazan	0 – 1	Terek Grozny	Kazan
19:30 MSK (UTC+3)	Caktaš (yellow card) 30'; Zambrano (yellow card) 76'; M'Vila (yellow card) 76'; Sánchez (yellow card) 83'	Summary	Kuzyayev (yellow card) 15'; Pliyev (yellow card) 24'; Mbengue 44'; Rodolfo (yellow card) 83'	Stadium: Kazan Arena; Attendance: 15,121; Referee: Evgeny Turbin

29 April 2017 26	Lokomotiv Moscow	0 – 1	Rubin Kazan	Moscow
16:30 MSK (UTC+3)	Farfán (yellow card) 30'; Barinov (yellow card) 55'	Report	Tkachuk 20'; Sánchez (yellow card) 71'; Caktaš (yellow card) 82'; Zhemaletdinov (yellow card) 90+2'; Ryzhikov (yellow card) 90+3'	Stadium: Lokomotiv Stadium; Attendance: 7,035; Referee: Kirill Levnikov

7 May 2017 27	Rubin Kazan	2 – 1	Ufa	Kazan
16:30 MSK (UTC+3)	Caktaš 37' (pen.), 53'; Nabiullin (yellow card) 70'; M'Vila (yellow card) 80'; Kambolov (yellow card) 82'; Zhemaletdinov (yellow card) 87'	Summary	Stotsky 19' (yellow card) 77'; Sukhov (yellow card) 25'; Carp (yellow card) 37'; Zubarev (yellow card) 73'; Krotov (yellow card) 85'	Stadium: Kazan Arena; Attendance: 4,298; Referee: Vladimir Moskalyov

14 May 2017 28	Rostov	4 – 2	Rubin Kazan	Rostov-on-Don
19:00 MSK (UTC+3)	Azmoun 7', 51'; Poloz 19'; Kudryashov (yellow card) 22'; Noboa 73'	Report	M'Vila 75'; Kanunnikov 87'; Akhmetov (yellow card) 90'	Stadium: Olimp-2; Attendance: 11,091; Referee: Vladislav Bezborodov

17 May 2017 29	Rubin Kazan	0 – 2	CSKA Moscow	Kazan
19:30 MSK (UTC+3)	Caktaš (red card) 49'	Report	Vitinho 72'; Dzagoev 90+3'	Stadium: Kazan Arena; Attendance: 21,405; Referee: Mikhail Vilkov

21 May 2017 30	Amkar Perm	1 – 2	Rubin Kazan	Perm
15:00 MSK (UTC+3)	Gigolayev (yellow card) 59'; Jovičić 69'; Prokofyev (yellow card) 90+4'	Report	Jonathas 24' (yellow card) 68'; Kanunnikov 35'; Song (yellow card) 66' (yellow-red card) 84'; Sánchez (yellow card) 71'	Stadium: Zvezda Stadium; Attendance: 4,300; Referee: Oleg Sokolov

==== League table ====
Pos	Team	Pld	W	D	L	GF	GA	GD	Pts	Qualification or relegation
7	Ufa	30	12	7	11	22	25	−3	43	
8	Lokomotiv Moscow	30	10	12	8	39	27	+12	42	Qualification for the Europa League group stage (Note: Lokomotiv Moscow qualified for the Europa League group stage by winning the 2016–17 Russian Cup.)
9	Rubin Kazan	30	10	8	12	30	34	−4	38	
10	Amkar Perm	30	8	11	11	25	29	−4	35	
11	Ural Yekaterinburg	30	8	6	16	24	44	−20	30	

Source: Russian Premier League, Soccerway
Rules for classification: 1) Points; 2) Matches won; 3) Head-to-head points; 4) Head-to-head matches won; 5) Head-to-head goal difference; 6) Head-to-head goals scored; 7) Head-to-head away goals; 8) Goal difference; 9) Goals scored; 10) Away goals scored.

=== Russian Cup ===
21 September 2016 Round of 32	Chita	0 – 1	Rubin Kazan	Chita
11:00 MSK (UTC+3)		Summary	Dević 22'	Stadium: Lokomotiv Stadium; Attendance: 8,800; Referee: Igor Panin

26 October 2016 Round of 16	Rubin Kazan	1 – 0 (a.e.t.)	SKA-Khabarovsk	Kazan
19:00 MSK (UTC+3)	Ustinov (yellow card) 24'; Ozdoyev (yellow card) 52'; Dević (yellow card) 115'; Samu 118'	Summary	Kireyev (red card) 44'; Nikiforov (yellow card) 53'; Cherevko (yellow card) 119'	Stadium: Kazan Arena; Attendance: 4,360; Referee: Aleksei Sukhoy

1 March 2017 Quarterfinal	Rubin Kazan	1 – 0	Sibir Novosibirsk	Kazan
15:00 MSK (UTC+3)	Bauer (yellow card) 19'; Jonathas 88'; Zhemaletdinov (yellow card) 90+3'	Summary	Rukhaia (yellow card) 20'	Stadium: Kazan Arena; Attendance: 2,346; Referee: Evgeny Turbin

6 April 2017 Semifinal	Ural Yekaterinburg	2 – 1	Rubin Kazan	Yekaterinburg
17:00 MSK (UTC+3)	Ilyin 13'; Novikov 58'; Kulakov (yellow card) 81'	Summary	Jonathas 31'; Kambolov (yellow card) 87'	Stadium: SKB-Bank Arena; Attendance: 8,350; Referee: Aleksey Eskov

== Squad statistics ==
As of Match played 21 May 2017

=== Appearances and goals ===
No.	Pos	Nat	Player	Total		Premier League		Russian Cup	
No.	Pos	Nat	Player	Apps	Goals	Apps	Goals	Apps	Goals
1	GK	(Russia) RUS	Sergey Ryzhikov	31	0	29	0	2	0
2	DF	(Russia) RUS	Oleg Kuzmin	4	0	4	0	0	0
3	DF	(Russia) RUS	Elmir Nabiullin	28	1	25	1	3	0
4	MF	(France) FRA	Yann M'Vila	23	1	19+2	1	1+1	0
6	DF	(Spain) ESP	Sergio Sánchez	20	0	19+1	0	0	0
8	MF	(Cameroon) CMR	Alex Song	16	0	12+4	0	0	0
9	FW	(Russia) RUS	Maksim Kanunnikov	23	7	22	7	1	0
10	MF	(Belgium) BEL	Maxime Lestienne	16	3	5+8	3	3	0
20	MF	(Croatia) CRO	Mijo Caktaš	21	2	13+4	2	3+1	0
21	MF	(Spain) ESP	Rubén Rochina	26	2	16+7	2	1+2	0
22	FW	(Brazil) BRA	Jonathas	30	11	23+3	9	2+2	2
23	DF	(Switzerland) SUI	Moritz Bauer	23	0	19+2	0	2	0
25	DF	(Peru) PER	Carlos Zambrano	24	0	20+1	0	3	0
27	MF	(Russia) RUS	Magomed Ozdoyev	12	0	7+3	0	2	0
31	MF	(Russia) RUS	Denis Tkachuk	24	2	17+5	2	1+1	0
49	DF	(Russia) RUS	Vitali Ustinov	9	0	5+2	0	2	0
61	MF	(Turkey) TUR	Gökdeniz Karadeniz	11	0	4+4	0	1+2	0
70	MF	(Russia) RUS	Georgi Makhatadze	3	0	0+3	0	0	0
85	MF	(Russia) RUS	Ilzat Akhmetov	15	0	9+3	0	0+3	0
88	MF	(Russia) RUS	Ruslan Kambolov	21	1	16+3	1	2	0
90	DF	(Russia) RUS	Taras Burlak	26	0	21+1	0	4	0
91	GK	(Russia) RUS	Yuri Nesterenko	3	0	1	0	2	0
96	FW	(Russia) RUS	Rifat Zhemaletdinov	26	0	12+11	0	3	0
Players away from the club on loan:
5	DF	(Georgia (country)) GEO	Solomon Kvirkvelia	1	0	0	0	1	0
13	DF	(Sweden) SWE	Emil Bergström	5	0	3+1	0	1	0
77	MF	(Spain) ESP	Samu	15	1	7+6	0	2	1
Players who appeared for Rubin Kazan no longer at the club:
7	FW	(Russia) RUS	Igor Portnyagin	2	0	1+1	0	0	0
11	FW	(Ukraine) UKR	Marko Dević	10	2	1+7	1	2	1

=== Goal scorers ===
Place	Position	Nation	Number	Name	Premier League	Russian Cup	Total
1	FW	(Brazil)	22	Jonathas	9	2	11
2	FW	(Russia)	9	Maksim Kanunnikov	7	0	7
3	MF	(Belgium)	10	Maxime Lestienne	3	0	3
4	MF	(Spain)	21	Rubén Rochina	2	0	2
4	MF	(Russia)	31	Denis Tkachuk	2	0	2
4	MF	(Croatia)	20	Mijo Caktaš	2	0	2
4	FW	(Ukraine)	11	Marko Dević	1	1	2
8	MF	(Russia)	88	Ruslan Kambolov	1	0	1
8	DF	(Russia)	3	Elmir Nabiullin	1	0	1
8	MF	(France)	4	Yann M'Vila	1	0	1
8	MF	(Spain)	77	Samu	0	1	1
8				Own goal	1	0	1
				TOTALS	30	4	34

=== Disciplinary record ===
Number	Nation	Position	Name	Premier League		Russian Cup		Total	
Number	Nation	Position	Name	Yellow card	Red card	Yellow card	Red card	Yellow card	Red card
1	(Russia)	GK	Sergey Ryzhikov	3	0	0	0	3	0
3	(Russia)	DF	Elmir Nabiullin	7	1	0	0	7	1
4	(France)	MF	Yann M'Vila	2	0	0	0	2	0
6	(Spain)	DF	Sergio Sánchez	8	0	0	0	8	0
8	(Cameroon)	MF	Alex Song	3	1	0	0	3	1
9	(Russia)	FW	Maksim Kanunnikov	5	1	0	0	5	1
10	(Belgium)	MF	Maxime Lestienne	2	0	0	0	2	0
11	(Ukraine)	FW	Marko Dević	1	0	1	0	2	0
20	(Croatia)	MF	Mijo Caktaš	3	2	0	0	3	2
21	(Spain)	MF	Rubén Rochina	2	0	0	0	2	0
22	(Brazil)	FW	Jonathas	3	0	0	0	3	0
23	(Switzerland)	DF	Moritz Bauer	4	0	1	0	5	0
25	(Peru)	DF	Carlos Zambrano	6	1	0	0	6	1
27	(Russia)	MF	Magomed Ozdoyev	1	0	1	0	2	0
31	(Russia)	MF	Denis Tkachuk	1	0	0	0	1	0
49	(Russia)	DF	Vitali Ustinov	0	0	1	0	1	0
85	(Russia)	MF	Ilzat Akhmetov	1	0	0	0	1	0
88	(Russia)	MF	Ruslan Kambolov	5	0	1	0	6	0
90	(Russia)	DF	Taras Burlak	2	0	0	0	2	0
96	(Russia)	FW	Rifat Zhemaletdinov	3	0	1	0	4	0
			TOTALS	62	6	6	0	68	6
