= Yann M'Vila =

French footballer (born 1990)

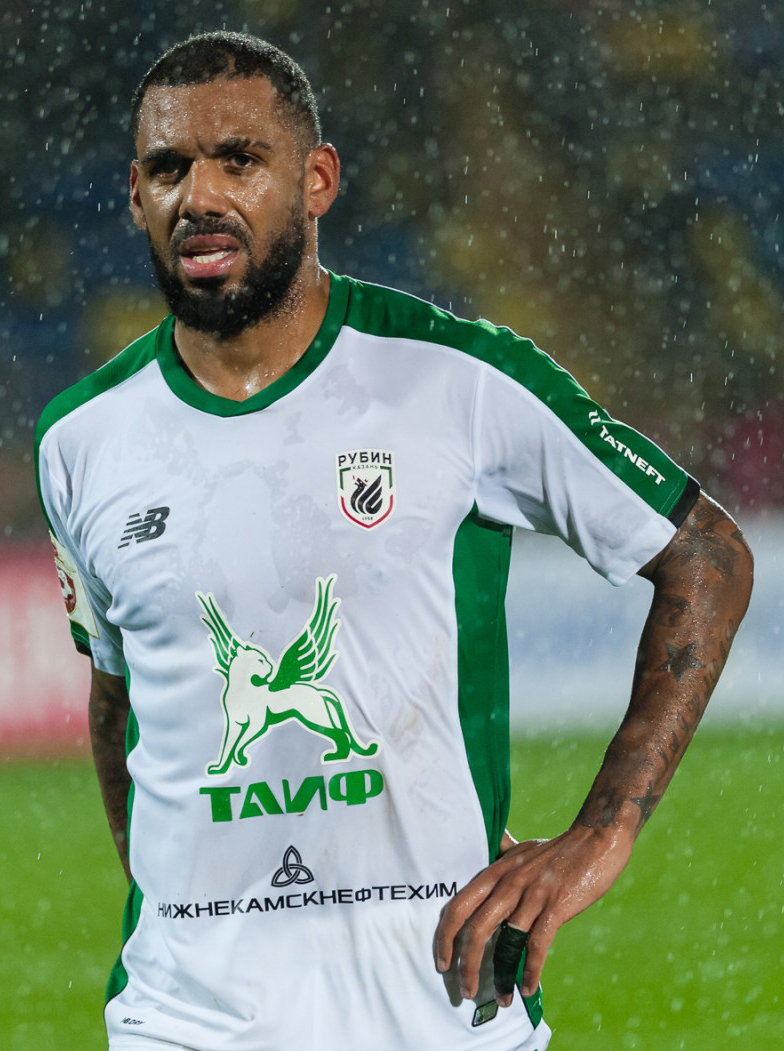
- M'Vila playing for Rubin Kazan in 2017

Personal information
- Full name: Yann Gérard M'Vila
- Date of birth: 29 June 1990 (age 36)
- Place of birth: Amiens, France
- Height: 1.82 m (6 ft 0 in)
- Position: Defensive midfielder

Team information
- Current team: Sanremese
- Number: 17

Youth career
- 1996–1999: Sains-Saint-Fussien
- 1999–2004: Amiens
- 2004: Mantes
- 2004–2009: Rennes

Senior career*
Years	Team	Apps	(Gls)
2007–2012	Rennes B	34	(0)
2009–2013	Rennes	126	(2)
2013–2018	Rubin Kazan	64	(3)
2014–2015	→ Inter Milan (loan)	8	(0)
2015–2016	→ Sunderland (loan)	37	(1)
2018–2020	Saint-Étienne	78	(0)
2020–2023	Olympiacos	95	(5)
2024	West Bromwich Albion	9	(0)
2024–2026	Caen	48	(5)
2026–	Sanremese	5	(0)

International career
2009–2012	France U21	8	(0)
2010–2012	France	22	(1)
- * Club domestic league appearances and goals as of 27 September 2026

Yann Gérard M'Vila (born 29 June 1990) is a French professional footballer who plays as a defensive midfielder for Serie D club Sanremese.

M'Vila is a French international, having played at all levels for which he was eligible. He has captained several of his age groups including the under-19 team that reached the semi-finals of the 2009 UEFA European Under-19 Championship. M'Vila also played on France teams that participated in the 2007 UEFA European Under-17 Championship and the 2007 FIFA U-17 World Cup. M'Vila made his senior team debut on 11 August 2010 in a friendly against Norway, and was part of the French squad which reached the quarter-finals of UEFA Euro 2012.

== Club career ==
=== Early career ===
M'Vila began his football career at age six for ES Sains-Saint-Fussien. He spent three years at the club and, in July 1999, joined the biggest club in the region, Amiens SC. M'Vila joined the club as a youth player and practised in the club's soccer school, which was established by his father, who had previously played on the club's reserve team. After spending five seasons at the club, M'Vila left the club after developing friction and ventured to Paris to join Mantes. During his short stint at Mantes, M'Vila lived with his grandparents. M'Vila admitted that, during his time at Mantes, he had "forgot his dream" of becoming a professional footballer. The desire was brought back after he was discovered by a Rennes scout in October 2004. The following month, M'Vila departed Mantes to join the prestigious youth academy of Rennes after signing an aspirant (youth) contract with the club.

Among M'Vila's teammates in the youth system included fellow prospects Damien Le Tallec, the younger brother of Anthony Le Tallec, Yohann Lasimant, Abdoul Camara and Yacine Brahimi. The combination of M'Vila, Brahimi, Camara, and Le Tallec, all four being members of the class of 1990, were particularly instrumental in their youth team's successes. With the under-16 team, the foursome won the Tournoi Carisport, a national tournament that regularly pits the top academies in France against each other. Two seasons later with the under-18 team, M'Vila won the under-18 league championship for the 2006–07 season. In 2008, the youth academy achieved its biggest honour after winning the Coupe Gambardella. The title was Rennes' third Gambardella Cup and its first since 2003 when the likes of Yoann Gourcuff and Sylvain Marveaux were playing in the competition. In the final, Rennes faced Bordeaux and M'Vila was tasked with the objective of containing fellow French starlet Grégory Sertic. He accomplished the task and also scored a goal on a left-footed strike from 25 metres (27 yd) out leading the team to a 3–0 victory.

=== Rennes ===
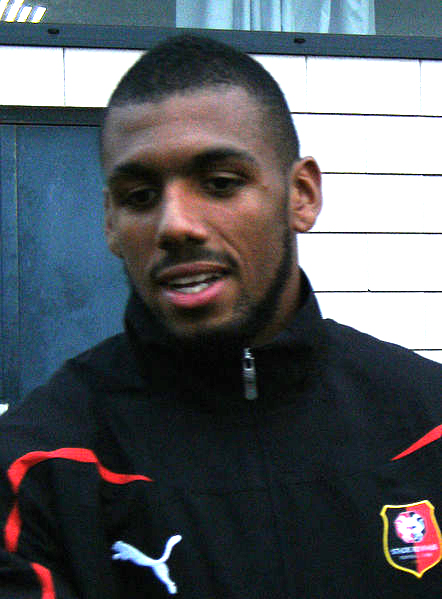
M'Vila in Rennes colours, 2010

Following the 2006–07 season, on 11 August 2007 M'Vila, alongside teammates Le Tallec and Camara, signed his first professional contract after agreeing to a three-year deal with Rennes. He spent the entire season playing on the club's reserve team in the Championnat de France Amateur in the fourth division before being officially promoted to the senior squad and assigned the number 15 shirt for the 2008–09 season. Due to having minor surgery on his toenail and his attitude being questioned by manager Guy Lacombe, M'Vila missed significant practice time with the senior team and began the season with the club's Championnat de France Amateur team for the second consecutive year. Despite Lacombe questioning the player's attitude, M'Vila has declared that he bears no ill feelings towards Lacombe. He subsequently appeared in 20 matches with the reserve team and scored no goals as the team finished first among professional clubs in its group, thus qualifying for the play-offs, where the club lost to Lyon in the semi-finals.

Following a successful international campaign with the France under-19 team, on 13 August 2009, new manager Frédéric Antonetti announced that M'Vila would be earning some significant playing time with the club for the 2009–10 season. Two days later, after appearing with the CFA team in the first week of the season, he was named to the 19-man squad to face Nice. He made his professional debut in that match appearing as a substitute in the 80th minute. Due to the suspension of Japanese midfielder Junichi Inamoto, M'Vila earned his first start the following week against Marseille. He played the entire match, which ended 1–1. The following week against Lens, M'Vila earned his first professional red card. After returning from suspension, M'Vila never lost his place within the team breaking the starting eleven in all the remaining league matches, save for one.

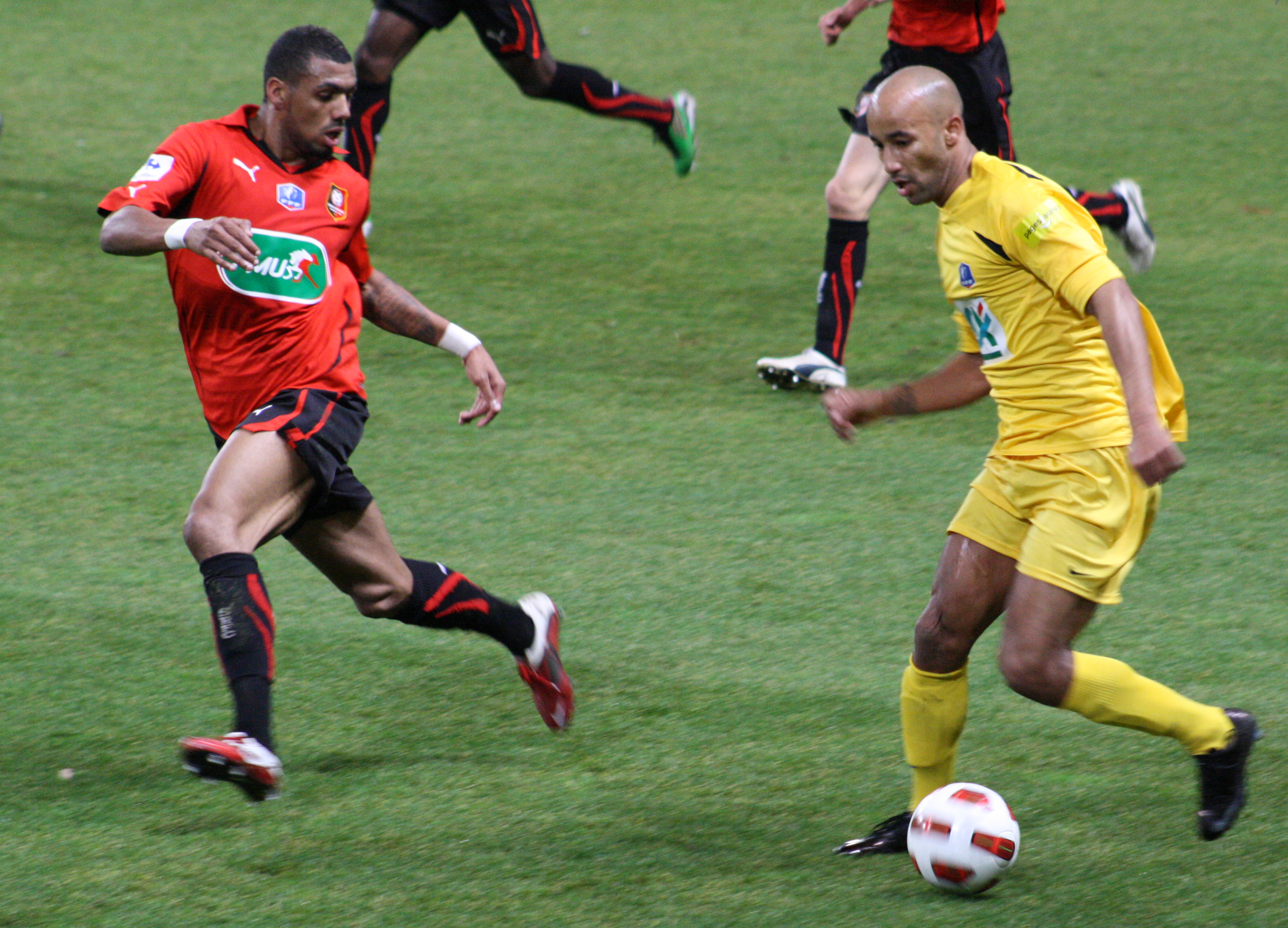
M'Vila (left) scored his first professional goal in the Coupe de France against Cannes in 2011

On 15 September 2009, M'Vila signed a contract extension with Rennes until June 2013. On 27 August 2010, he agreed to another extension with the club. The new deal extends until 2014. On 18 December, in a 1–0 win over Valenciennes, M'Vila played the entire match completing 100 of his 112 attempted passes, the former statistical output being a league-high for the season. Due to his performances domestically and internationally, M'Vila was linked to Spanish club Real Madrid and English club Liverpool during the fall season. In December 2010, the midfielder quelled the interest by declaring his commitment to Rennes and also jokingly stating that he would only depart Rennes after scoring his first goal. Coincidentally, he scored his first professional goal on 9 January 2011 in a 7–0 hammering of Championnat National club Cannes in the Coupe de France. A week later, M'Vila scored his first career league goal in a 4–0 win over Arles-Avignon. On 20 February, M'Vila scored the opening goal for Rennes, converting a free kick, in a 2–1 win over Toulouse. M'Vila was rewarded for his performances during the season with a nomination for the UNFP Ligue 1 Young Player of the Year. The midfielder lost out on the award to national team teammate Mamadou Sakho, but was given consolation with an appearance on the organisation's Team of the Year. A day later, Rennes confirmed on its website that M'Vila had signed a one-year contract extension with the club. The new deal will keep him with Rennes until 2015.

M'Vila opened the 2011–12 season making his European debut in a UEFA Europa League third qualifying round first leg tie against Georgian club Metalurgi Rustavi on 28 July 2011. M'Vila played the entire match in a 5–2 win. On 25 August, he scored his first and only goal of the campaign in a 4–0 second leg win over Serbian club Red Star Belgrade in the Europa League play-off round. On 15 September, M'Vila captained Rennes for the first time in a 1–1 league draw with Nancy. He finished the campaign appearing in a career-high 50 matches, which included all 38 league contests, as Rennes finished in sixth place. Despite consistently appearing with the team, as the season progressed, M'Vila was subjected to criticism from the club's supporters due to his under-performance as perceived by them. The criticism culminated on 11 April 2012 following the midfielder's performance in Rennes' shock 2–1 defeat to semi-professional club Quevilly in the semi-finals of the Coupe de France. In the team's ensuing match against Nice, M'Vila was jeered by the club's support. The midfielder was defended by his coach Antonetti, who declared, "We demand a lot from M'Vila. But, we forget that he has already given so much to the club," while also joking that M'Vila "touched the ball so much that they [supporters] couldn't keep up. It made me smile a little".

=== Rubin Kazan ===
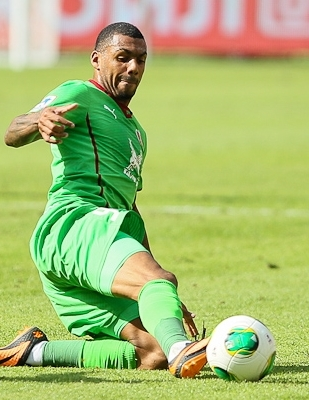
M'Vila playing for Rubin Kazan in 2013

On 22 January 2013, it was announced that Rennes had accepted an offer in the region of €12 million from Rubin Kazan for M'Vila.

M'Vila went AWOL during the 2013–14 winter break, failing to join Rubin Kazan's training camp in Turkey and instead returning to France. This caused a dispute with coach Rinat Bilyaletdinov.

==== Inter Milan (loan) ====
On 15 July 2014, M'Vila joined Inter Milan on loan from Rubin Kazan until the end of the 2014–15 season with an option to purchase the player on a permanent basis. He made his Serie A debut on 31 August as they began the season with a goalless draw at Torino; he was substituted after 56 minutes for fellow debutant Dani Osvaldo. On 25 January, it was announced that the loan had been terminated and therefore M'vila returned to Kazan following a disagreement with new Inter manager Roberto Mancini.

M'Vila spent a period training with Dynamo Moscow, but did not officially sign for the Russian club after a dispute resulting in the trashing of his Moscow home.

==== Sunderland (loan) ====
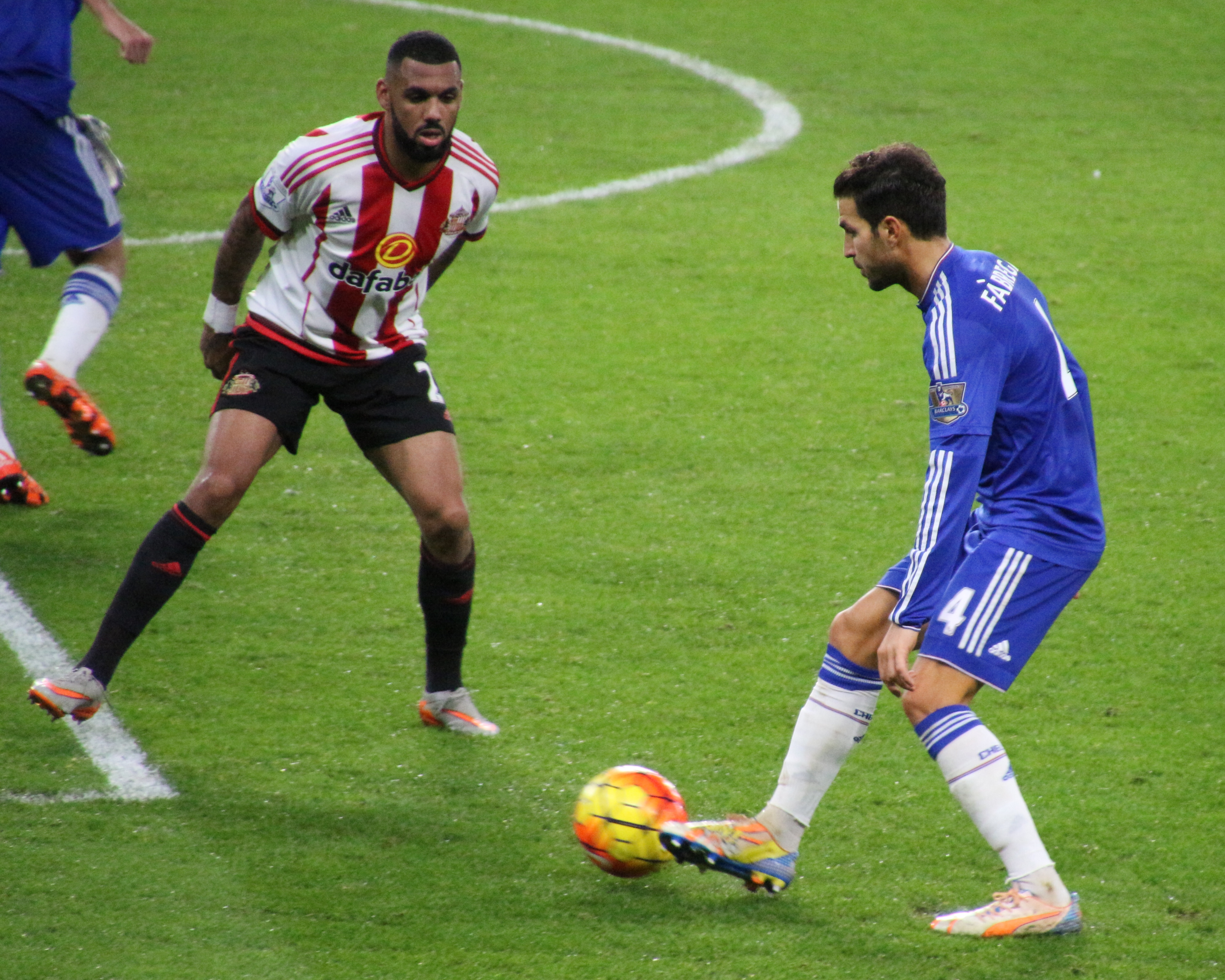
M'Vila playing for Sunderland against Chelsea in 2015

On 6 August 2015, M'Vila joined English Premier League side Sunderland on a season-long loan with a view to being made a permanent deal. He made his first appearance for the club in an under-21 match against Norwich City, but was sent off after 69 minutes for a head-butt on Jamar Loza. On 29 August 2015, M'Vila scored his first Sunderland goal, a long range free-kick against Aston Villa. On 25 October 2015, M'Vila was named the Premier League man of the match in Sunderland's 3–0 home victory over Newcastle United in the Tyne-Wear derby. He subsequently described the atmosphere of the match as the best he had played in, eclipsing that of the Milan Derby. After another man of the match performance in a 3–1 defeat at Arsenal on 5 December 2015, M'Vila was praised by teammate Ola Toivonen, who described him as "a top European player. As he plays more games he's going to show that he's the top player we know he is".

In February 2016, M'Vila expressed his desire to stay at Sunderland on a permanent basis, provided the 'Black Cats' avoided relegation. He also hoped to reach an agreement with Rubin Kazan to terminate his contract, which was running until December 2016. M'Vila ultimately finished the season with 37 league appearances for Sunderland, as they ultimately secured survival with a 3–0 home victory over Everton on 11 May 2016. Manager Sam Allardyce confirmed both club and player were keen to make the move permanent.

On 1 September 2016, M'Vila took his frustrations to Instagram, after the club rejected to sign the player by not picking up the phone. M'Vila was a fan favourite during his time in the North East, which caused an angry repost towards Sunderland club owner Ellis Short.

==== Return to Rubin ====
M'Vila played his first game for Rubin in two years upon the return from loans on 22 September 2016 when he came on as a substitute in a Russian Cup matchup against Chita. Rubin manager Javi Gracia chose to play Alex Song over M'Vila at the defensive midfield position in all the league games up to that point. M'Vila returned to league action for Rubin on 2 October 2016, when he was a late substitute in a game against Krasnodar. In Rubin's next match, against Krylia Sovetov Samara on 15 October, M'Vila returned to the starting line-up, pushing Song to the bench. On 26 December, M'Vila signed a three-and-a-half-year contract extension with Rubin that was expected to run until the summer of 2020.

=== Saint-Etienne ===
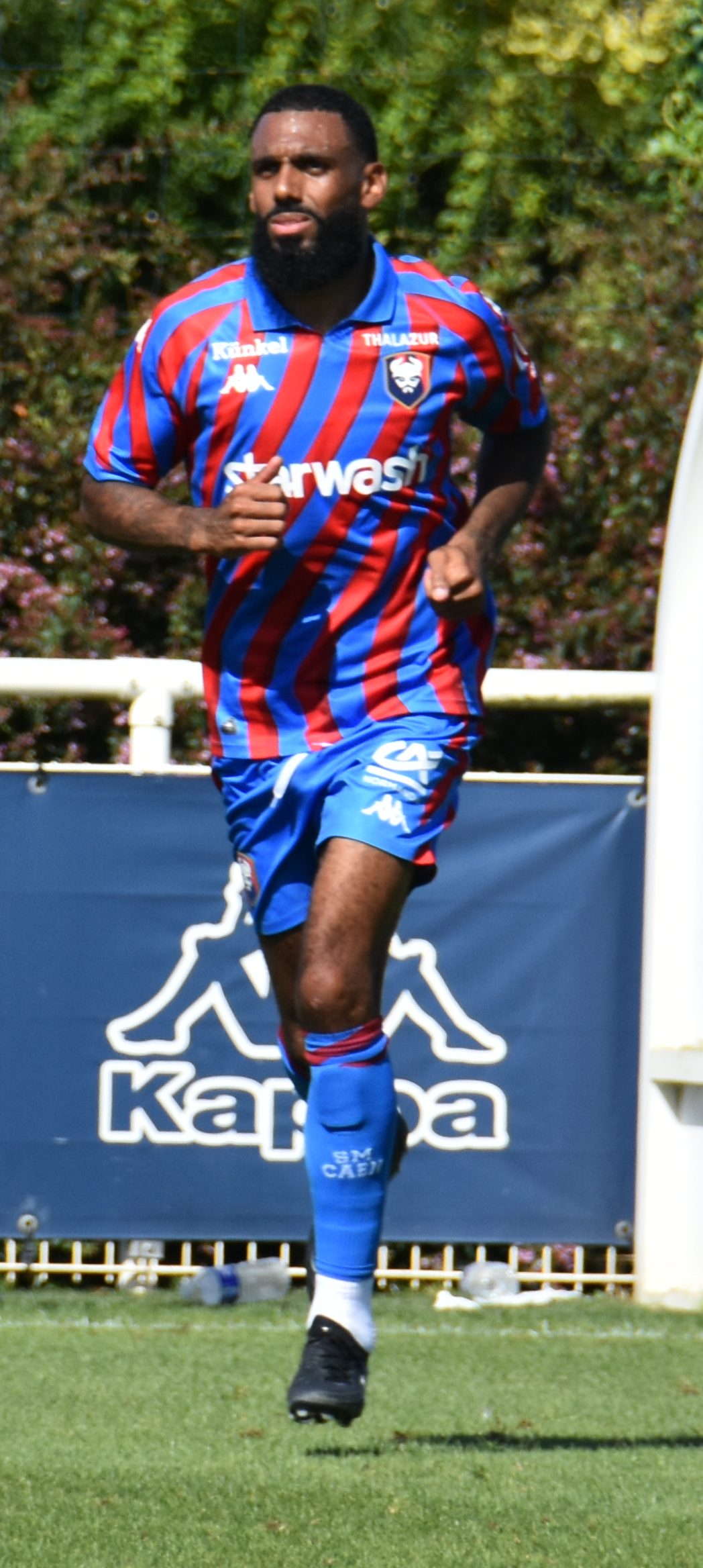
M'Vila playing for Caen in 2024

On 12 January 2018, M'Vila was released from his Rubin Kazan contract, before signing for Saint-Étienne until the summer of 2019.

=== Olympiacos ===
On 13 September 2020, M'Vila signed a three-year contract with Super League Greece club Olympiacos.

=== West Bromwich Albion ===
On 19 February 2024, English side West Bromwich Albion announced the signing of M'Vila until the end of the 2023–24 season, thus rejoining his former coach at Olympiacos, Carlos Corberán. On 22 May 2024, the club announced he would be leaving in the summer when his contract expired.

=== Caen ===
On 6 August 2024, M'Vila joined Ligue 2 club Caen on a two-year deal.

== International career ==
=== Youth ===
M'Vila has featured for all of France's national youth teams for which he was eligible beginning with the under-16 team. He made his international debut with the team on 23 May 2006 in a friendly against Romania. M'Vila made his only other appearance in the team in the return leg against Romania. M'Vila began featuring as a regular international with the under-17 team making his debut on 5 December 2006 in a friendly match against the Czech Republic. M'Vila scored his first international goal on 20 February 2007 against Portugal in the Algarve Cup. He was a member of the team that reached the semi-finals at the 2007 UEFA European Under-17 Championship where they lost to England. In the competition, M'Vila scored a goal against group stage opponents Ukraine in a 2–2 draw. The draw resulted in France advancing to the 2007 FIFA U-17 World Cup held in South Korea. M'Vila appeared in all five matches helping the team reach the quarter-finals where they were defeated by Spain on penalties.

With the under-18 team, M'Vila appeared in six of the ten matches the team contested. He made his debut with the team in its opening match against the United States in the Tournoi de Limoges. M'Vila appeared in all 18 matches scoring 3 goals with the under-19 team. He was given the honour of captaining the team by coach Jean Gallice. He scored one goal during the qualification process against Romania in a 3–0 victory. The victory assured qualification to the tournament. At the tournament, held in Ukraine, M'Vila appeared in all three group stage matches helping France reach the semi-finals. Due to picking up a yellow card in back-to-back matches, M'Vila missed the semi-final defeat to England. Upon receiving the yellow card in the final group stage match against Spain, a very distraught M'Vila palmed his face into his knees as he knew he would miss the important semi-final match.

Just days after the under-19 elimination, M'Vila was called up to the under-21 team, the only one of the under-19 squad, to participate in the team's friendly match against Poland on 12 August. He made his under-21 debut in that match appearing as a substitute in the 74th minute of a 2–2 draw. On 25 February 2010, M'Vila was reportedly named to the senior team for their friendly against Spain on 3 March. The news was based on the preliminary list sent to news agencies minutes before coach Raymond Domenech was to announce the squad in a press conference. However, following the formalisation of the list at the start of the press conference, his name was replaced with Marseille midfielder Benoît Cheyrou. M'Vila was later called up to the under-21 team for their friendly against Croatia, but withdrew from the team due to injury.

=== Senior ===
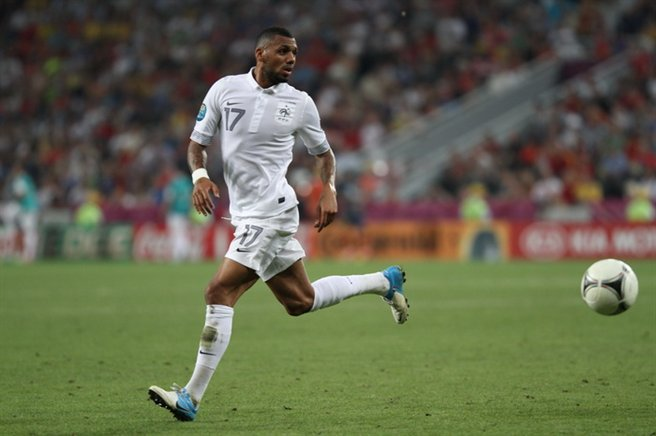
M'Vila playing for France at UEFA Euro 2012.

On 11 May, M'Vila was named to the 30-man preliminary list by Domenech to play in the 2010 FIFA World Cup but failed to make the final 23. On 5 August 2010, M'Vila was officially called up to the senior team for the first time by new manager Laurent Blanc for the team's friendly match against Norway on 11 August 2010. He earned his first senior cap in the match starting in the defensive midfielder role. Despite France losing the match 2–1, M'Vila earned rave reviews for his performance, with many media outlets in France naming him the team's player of the match.

Following his debut, M'Vila appeared in five consecutive matches for France. After starting in the team's UEFA Euro 2012 qualifying victory over Bosnia and Herzegovina in September 2010, he became the only player to feature as a starter in Blanc's first three matches as manager. On 25 March 2011, M'Vila completed 92.5% of his 134 attempted passes in a 2–0 UEFA Euro 2012 qualifying win over Luxembourg. The feat was the best by any France player in an international match since 2006. On 2 September 2011, M'Vila scored his first international goal in a 2–1 Euro qualifying victory over Albania.

After appearing regularly in qualifying for Euro 2012, on 29 May 2012 M'Vila was named to the squad to participate in the competition. After missing the team's opening match against England due to an ankle injury, on 15 June, he made his debut at a senior international competition in the team's second group stage match against Ukraine. M'Vila appeared as a substitute for Alou Diarra in the second half as France won the match 2–0.

M'Vila last played for French representative teams when he featured in both legs of the France U21 team's qualification play-off with Norway U21; the Norwegians' aggregate victory meant France failed to qualify for the final tournament. On 8 November 2012, M'Vila was banned from national team matches until June 2014 after an unauthorised night out while on under-21 duty.

== Style of play ==
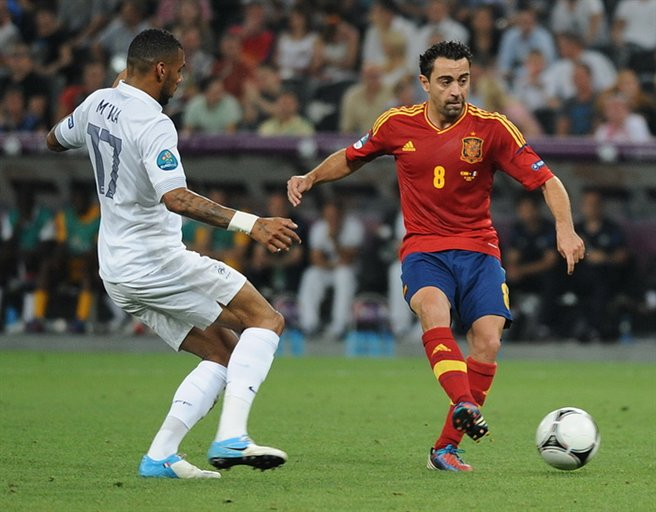
M'Vila challenging Spain captain Xavi during a match at Euro 2012

M'Vila primarily plays as a defensive midfielder and is described as a player who "boasts a fantastic work-rate" and is "robust in the challenge". He is also known for his passing ability and "superb vision". M'Vila has earned critical acclaim for his playing style, which has led to coaches and players drawing comparisons to fellow French internationals Patrick Vieira and Claude Makélélé. Under manager Frédéric Antonetti at Rennes, despite playing as a defensive midfielder, M'Vila acts as the team's deep-lying playmaker and is often instrumental in building-up attacks from the back. His importance in the team was shown in Rennes' 1–0 league defeat to Toulouse during the 2011–12 season, in which the Bretagne side failed to produce anything offensively. M'Vila, himself, declared that Rennes struggled because he was forced to play in a withdrawn role due to "the opponents being organized to close me down" and, as a result, he was "not in the drivers' seat". Though, he plays as a defensive midfielder, M'Vila can also play as a box-to-box midfielder as he has done at times under Laurent Blanc at international level.

M'Vila's passing ability and ability to retain possession consistently has been described as "precise" and "imaginative", respectively. His manager Antonetti has declared that M'Vila "reads the game like Makélélé, has the presence of Vieira and can pass the ball like Yaya Touré". In the past two Ligue 1 seasons (2010–11 and 2011–12), M'Vila led the league each season in passes attempted and passes completed finishing the campaigns with a combined passing percentage of 84%. In the 2010–11 season, he finished third behind attacking midfielders Yohan Cabaye and Morgan Amalfitano in balls played. Despite his position, M'Vila is also known for his disciplined style of play. So far in his career as a professional, in which he has accumulated over 120 appearances, M'Vila has collected only 16 yellow cards and suffered only one expulsion, which came in his third professional appearance; he was also expelled from the team's 2011–12 UEFA Europa League group stage match against Celtic in November 2011, but this was after incurring a second bookable offence.

Despite the positive opinions, M'Vila has endured criticism, most notably from Rennes' former manager Guy Lacombe, who viewed the player as a "loose cannon" while also questioning M'Vila's attitude and dedication. While M'Vila initially voiced his frustration at his lack of playing time under Lacombe, he has since stated he bears no ill feelings towards his former manager. After hearing M'Vila's initial frustrations in May 2010, Lacombe informed French publication France Football that, "If he [M'Vila] had a black season, it's more his fault than that of the coaches," referring to M'Vila's 2008–09 season after signing his first professional contract.

== Personal life ==
M'Vila was born in Amiens, in the Somme department. His father, Jean-Elvis M'Vila, is a former footballer originally from the Republic of the Congo. He moved to France in 1983 and played football for thirteen years, regularly turning out for the reserves of local club Amiens. His father currently resides in Cholet. He was a police officer and now works in metallurgy. Yann also has two younger sisters and an older brother. His brother, Yohan M'Vila, is a former professional footballer. Yann, himself, is married and has a son who was born when he was eighteen years old.

== Career statistics ==
=== Club ===
As of match played end of 2025/26 season

Appearances and goals by club, season and competition
Club	Season	League			National cup (Note: Includes Coupe de France, Russian Cup, FA Cup, Greek Cup)		League cup (Note: Includes Coupe de la Ligue, Football League Cup)		Europe		Total	
Club	Season	Division	Apps	Goals	Apps	Goals	Apps	Goals	Apps	Goals	Apps	Goals
Rennes	2009–10	Ligue 1	35	0	3	0	1	0	—		39	0
Rennes	2010–11	Ligue 1	37	2	3	1	1	0	—		41	3
Rennes	2011–12	Ligue 1	38	0	5	0	0	0	7 (Note: Appearances in UEFA Europa League)	1	50	1
Rennes	2012–13	Ligue 1	16	0	1	0	3	0	—		20	0
Rennes	Total		126	2	12	1	5	0	7	1	150	4
Rubin Kazan	2012–13	Russian Premier League	5	0	0	0	—		0	0	5	0
Rubin Kazan	2013–14	Russian Premier League	19	0	0	0	—		13	0	32	0
Rubin Kazan	2016–17	Russian Premier League	21	1	2	0	—		—		23	1
Rubin Kazan	2017–18	Russian Premier League	19	2	1	0	—		—		20	2
Rubin Kazan	Total		64	3	3	0	0	0	13	0	80	3
Inter Milan (loan)	2014–15	Serie A	8	0	0	0	—		6	0	14	0
Sunderland (loan)	2015–16	Premier League	37	1	1	0	2	0	—		40	1
Saint-Étienne	2017–18	Ligue 1	17	0	0	0	—		—		17	0
Saint-Étienne	2018–19	Ligue 1	37	0	2	0	1	0	—		40	0
Saint-Étienne	2019–20	Ligue 1	23	0	4	0	1	0	5	0	33	0
Saint-Étienne	2020–21	Ligue 1	1	0	0	0	—		—		1	0
Saint-Étienne	Total		78	1	6	0	4	0	5	0	91	1
Olympiacos	2020–21	Super League Greece	33	4	5	1	—		12 (Note: Eight appearances in UEFA Champions League, four appearances and one goal in UEFA Europa League)	1	50	6
Olympiacos	2021–22	Super League Greece	31	1	3	0	—		11 (Note: Two appearances and one goal in UEFA Champions League, nine appearances in UEFA Europa League)	1	45	2
Olympiacos	2022–23	Super League Greece	31	0	4	0	—		11 (Note: Two appearances in UEFA Champions League, nine appearances in UEFA Europa League)	0	46	0
Olympiacos	Total		95	5	12	1	—		34	2	141	8
West Bromwich Albion	2023–24	EFL Championship	9	0	0	0	—		—		9	0
Caen	2024–25	Ligue 2	19	1	0	0	—		—		19	1
Career Total			391	12	33	2	9	0	49	3	490	17

=== International ===
Appearances and goals by national team and year
National team	Year	Apps	Goals
France	2010	5	0
France	2011	12	1
France	2012	5	0
Total		22	1

Scores and results list France's goal tally first, score column indicates score after each M'Vila goal.

List of international goals scored by Yann M'Vila
No.	Date	Venue	Opponent	Score	Result	Competition	Ref.
1	2 September 2011	Qemal Stafa Stadium, Tirana, Albania	Albania	2–0	2–1	UEFA Euro 2012 qualifying	

== Honours ==
Rennes U19

- Coupe Gambardella: 2007–08

Saint-Étienne

- Coupe de France runner-up: 2019–20

Olympiacos

- Super League Greece: 2020–21, 2021–22
- Greek Football Cup runner-up: 2020–21

Individual

- UNFP Ligue 1 Team of the Year: 2010–11
- Super League Greece Team of the Season: 2020–21, 2021–22
