= Maxime Lestienne =

Belgian footballer (born 1992)

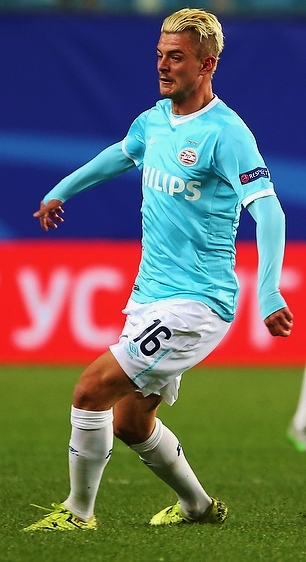
- Lestienne playing for PSV in a UEFA Champions League match against Atletico Madrid in 2016

Personal information
- Full name: Maxime Christophe Lestienne
- Date of birth: 17 June 1992 (age 34)
- Place of birth: Mouscron, Belgium
- Height: 1.78 m (5 ft 10 in)
- Position: Winger

Youth career
- 1996–2008: Mouscron

Senior career*
Years	Team	Apps	(Gls)
2008–2009	Mouscron	20	(3)
2010–2014	Club Brugge	127	(38)
2014–2016	Al-Arabi	0	(0)
2014–2015	→ Genoa (loan)	23	(1)
2015–2016	→ PSV (loan)	14	(1)
2016–2018	Rubin Kazan	23	(5)
2018	→ Málaga (loan)	12	(0)
2018–2022	Standard Liège	95	(17)
2022–2025	Lion City Sailors	80	(55)

International career
2007	Belgium U15	4	(1)
2007–2008	Belgium U16	11	(5)
2009	Belgium U17	5	(0)
2009	Belgium U18	1	(1)
2009–2011	Belgium U19	13	(4)
2010–2013	Belgium U21	7	(1)
- * Club domestic league appearances and goals as of 18 October 2025

Maxime Christophe Lestienne (French pronunciation: [maksim lɛstjɛn]; born 17 June 1992) is a Belgian professional footballer who last played as a winger for Singapore Premier League club Lion City Sailors. He is a free agent. He was also part of the Belgium national team after being called up in 2013 and 2019.

Lestienne played for the Sailors from 2022 to 2025, scoring 70 goals and providing 97 assists in 131 appearances across all competitions. During his four seasons in Singapore, he won two Singapore Premier League (SPL) titles and two Singapore Cups, and helped the team reach the 2025 AFC Champions League Two final.

His highest-scoring individual campaign came in 2023, when he was named the SPL Player of the Year and won the Golden Boot after recording 25 goals and 21 assists in 24 league matches. He left the club in 2025 upon the expiration of his contract. Subsequently, he is widely regarded as the greatest player in club history as well as one of the greatest players in SPL history.

== Club career ==
=== Mouscron ===
Lestienne came up through the youth ranks at Royal Excelsior Mouscron. At the time of his debut in the senior squad on 20 December 2008, Mouscron was competing in the Belgian First Division. Lestienne came on as a substitute for Asanda Sishuba in the 80th minute of a 5–1 home victory against Club Brugge.

=== Club Brugge ===
After the bankruptcy of Mouscron in 2009, Lestienne became available on a free transfer. Despite interest from English side Everton and Dutch side PSV, Lestienne eventually signed a contract with Club Brugge on 6 January 2010. He helped his club to a 3–3 draw to Sint-Truidense after scoring and assisting in a league match on 7 August 2011. Lestienne scored a brace in a league match against Beerschot in a 5–1 thrashing win on 5 February 2012. Lestienne scored his first hat-trick for the club in the Bruges derby on 23 September 2012 against Cercle Brugge. On 17 November 2012, Lestienne scored one and assisted four times in a 2–6 away win against Beveren. On 28 September 2013, he scored the only goal in the match securing a 3 points for his team against RAEC Mons. After four seasons with Club Brugge making a total of 39 goals and 35 assists in 157 appearances across all competition, Lestienne left the club.

=== Al-Arabi ===
On 31 August 2014, Lestienne moved overseas to joined Qatari side, Al-Arabi on a permanent transfer.

==== Loan to Genoa ====
However, Lestienne was loaned out to Serie A club Genoa until the end of the 2014–15 season almost immediately after signing for Qatari side Al-Arabi. He make his debut for the club on 21 September 2014 in a 1–0 win over Lazio. On 18 January 2015, he got himself a brace of assist as his club settled in a 3–3 draw against Sassuolo. Lestienne scored his first goal for the club equalising for his team which Genoa went on to win Inter Milan 3–2 on 23 May 2015.

==== Loan to PSV ====
On 12 July 2015, Lestienne was loaned out to Eredivisie club PSV until the end of the 2015–16 season. He scored his first goal for the club in a 3–1 win over Feyenoord on 30 August 2015. In the 2015–16 UEFA Champions League group stage fixture against Manchester United on 15 September 2015, Lestienne assisted twice to Héctor Moreno and Luciano Narsingh to secured a 2–1 home victory. On 30 September 2015, Lestienne scored a brace in the UEFA Champions League match against CSKA Moscow but fell short to a 3–2 defeat to the Russian club. Lestienne then helped the club to win the league title and also the Johan Cruyff Shield. Despite scoring 3 goals and contributing 10 assists in 19 appearances across all competition, PSV decided not to exercise its option to buy the player at the end of the loan spell.

=== Rubin Kazan ===
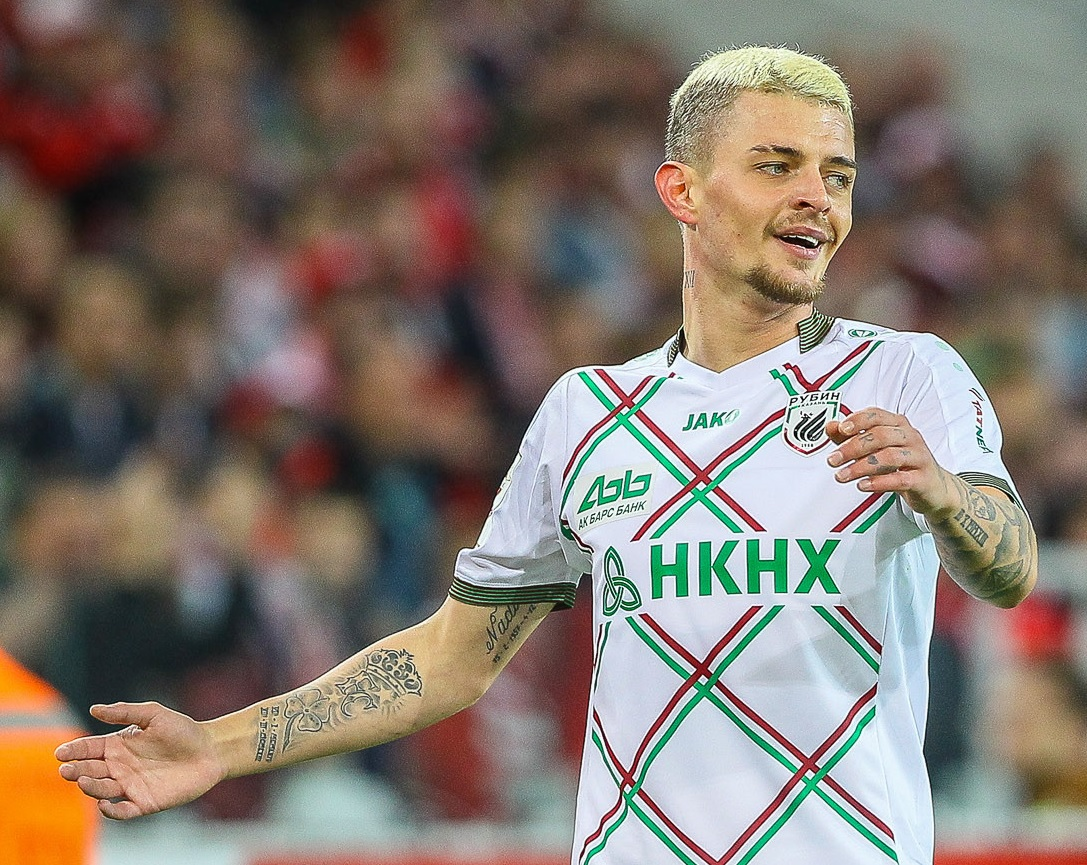
Lestienne with Rubin Kazan in a league match against Spartak Moscow in 2017

On 5 July 2016, Lestienne moved to Russian Premier League club Rubin Kazan ahead of the 2016–17 season. He scored on his debut 10 minutes after coming on as a substitution helping his team to a 3–1 win over Ural Yekaterinburg on 12 September 2016. On 10 April 2017, Lestienne scored a brace to help his team to secured a 2–2 draw against Tom Tomsk.

==== Loan to Málaga ====
On 31 January 2018, Lestienne joined La Liga club Málaga on loan until the end of the 2017–18 La Liga season. He make his debut for the club in a 2–1 lost to Valencia on 17 February. Lestienne then contribute an assist to Youssef En-Nesyri in the 13th minute, however, Malaga fall to a 2–1 defeat to Athletic Bilbao on 25 February.

=== Standard Liège ===
On 25 July 2018, Lestienne returned to Belgium, signing with Standard Liège. He make his debut for the club in a goalless draw against Sporting Charleroi on 15 September.

On 18 August 2019, Lestienne scored a brace in a 4–1 win over Mouscron. After returning from suspension that he picked up against KV Kortrijk on 25 August, he score a brace in a 4–1 win over KV Oostende on 14 September 2019. During the 2019–20 season in the UEFA Europa League group stage fixture on 7 November, Lestienne scored an injury time goal from a brilliant counterattack to a famous 2–1 victory against Eintracht Frankfurt. In the next UEFA Europa League match, he scored a goal against Vitória Guimarães in a 1–1 draw on 28 November. After 109 appearances and 21 goals for the club, he bid farewell.

=== Lion City Sailors ===
==== 2022 season ====
On 8 February 2022, Lestienne joined Singapore Premier League club, Lion City Sailors on a two-year deal. He made his debut for the club on 27 February where he assisted Diego Lopes who secured a 3–1 win over Hougang United. In the 2022 AFC Champions League group stage fixture on 18 April 2022, Lestienne assisted twice as Lion City Sailors made history and gained media attention for their 3–0 victory against Korean club, Daegu FC. On 24 April 2022, Lestienne scored his first AFC Champions League goal against Shandong Taishan in a 3–2 win. On 3 July 2022, he scored and contribute a hat-trick of assists in a 6–0 away win against Tanjong Pagar United. On 13 August 2022, he managed to get 2 goals and 4 assists in a 10–1 victory against Young Lions. 2 gameweeks later, Lestienne scored 1 goal and 4 assists against Hougang United in a 9–4 victory at the Hougang Stadium. It was his 2nd quadruple of assists in the season and 3rd hat-trick of assist in the season. By Matchweek 22, Lestienne had racked up 10 goals and 20 assists for the Sailors. He ended the 2022 campaign with a wonderful performance of 16 goals and 28 assists across 34 matches. In his first season, Lestienne also won the 2022 Singapore Community Shield.

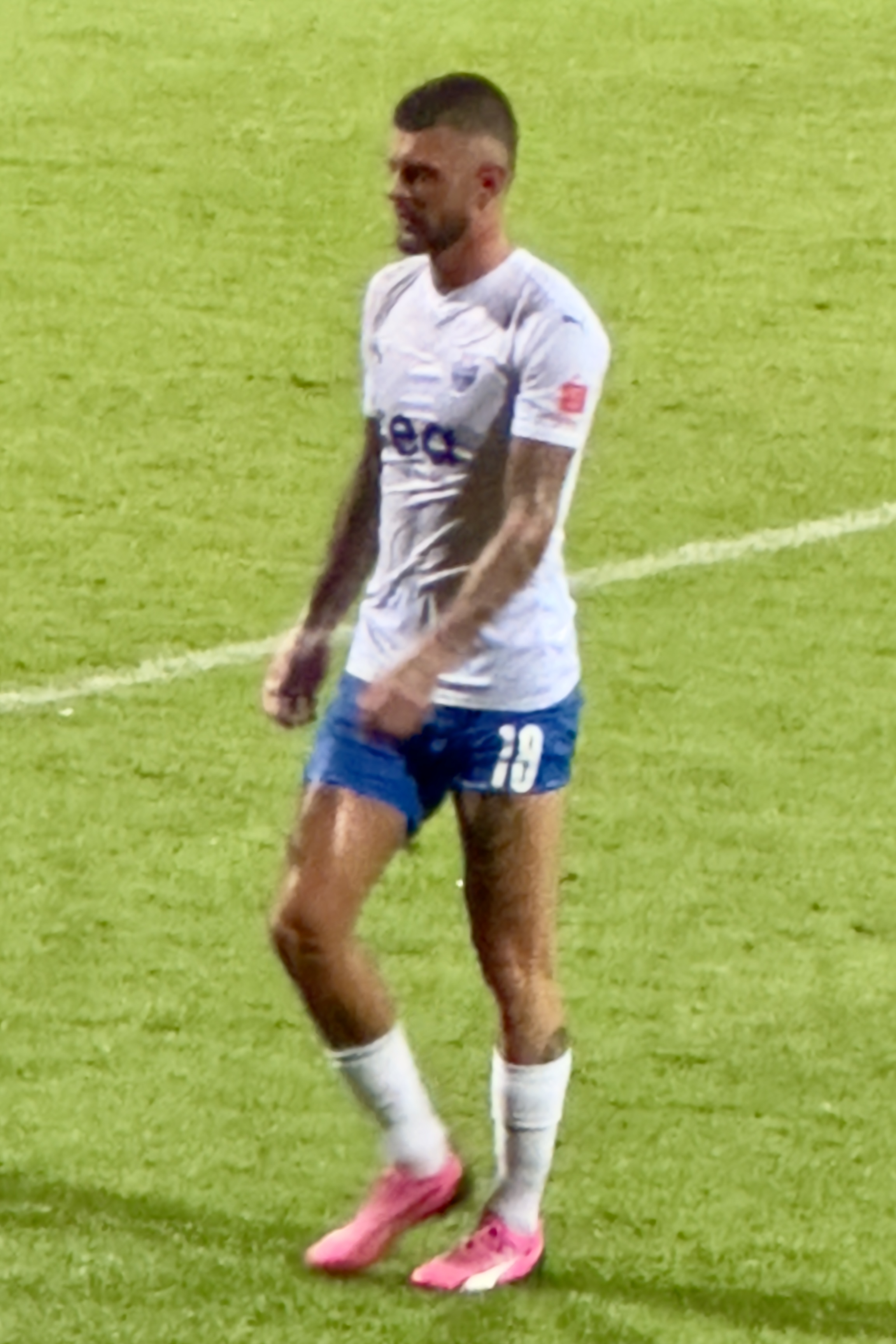
Lestienne playing for Lion City Sailors in a pre-season match in April 2024.

==== 2023 season ====
On 24 February 2023 during the 1st matchday fixture of the 2023 Singapore Premier League season, he racked up a hat-trick of assists against Tanjong Pagar United in which the Sailors came out victorious in a 3–1 win. On 1 July 2023, he made his 50th appearances for the Sailors with 31 goals and 41 assists in total. On 7 July 2023, Lestienne scored his first club hat-trick in 4–1 victory against Young Lions. On 4 August 2023, Lestienne scored his second hat-trick of the season against Tampines Rovers. It was his fastest career hat-trick in 25 minute. With the conclusion of the league, Lestienne went on to have exceptional performances throughout the season scoring 25 goals and providing 21 assists in 24 appearances. On 4 October 2023, Lestienne converted a penalty for his side in the 2023–24 AFC Champions League group stage match against Hong Kong club, Kitchee in a 2–1 away win. On 9 December 2023, he scored in the 2023 Singapore Cup Final which ended up with a victorious 3–1 win against defending champions, Hougang United where he won the cup. Lestienne's performance in the 2023 season rewarded him with the 'Player of the Year' award, 'Top Scorer' award and being named in the league 'Team of the Year'. He managed to grab a total of 26 goals and providing 29 assists in 35 appearances in 2023. On 15 December 2023, Lion City Sailors announced that Lestienne had signed a two-year contract extension until 2025.

==== 2024–25 season ====
On 4 May 2024, Lestienne helped his club to lift the 2024 Singapore Community Shield after providing an assist and scoring a goal in a 2–0 win over Albirex Niigata (S) which won him the 'Man of the Match' award. During the 2024–25 AFC Champions League Two fixture against Chinese club Zhejiang Professional on 19 September 2024, Lestienne scored in the 80th minute to secured a 2–0 win for the Sailors in which he curved the ball above the opposition goalkeeper Dong Chunyu. In total for the 2024–25 AFC Champions League Two, he scored 2 goals and provide 5 assists in the group stage qualifying the Lion City Sailors to the round of 16 as group leaders making them the first ever Singaporean Club to do so. On 14 March 2025, Lestienne make his 100th appearance for the club in a 1–1 draw against J1 League club Sanfrecce Hiroshima in the second leg of the 2024–25 AFC Champions League Two quarter-finals fixture. He holds the club's most goal contributions of 139 at that time. Lestienne helped the Sailors to create history, booking their spot in the final after a 2-1 aggregate victory in the semi-finals against Sydney FC. Lestienne won his first ever Singapore Premier League title after scoring the winning goal through a 21st-minute penalty against Tanjong Pagar United on 10 May 2025. The trophy and medals were presented on 14 May, after the match against Balestier Khalsa. Lestienne scored the equaliser in the 91st minute of the 2025 AFC Champions League Two final against Sharjah. However, the Sailors were unable to hold on and eventually conceded in the 97th minute to finish the game in a 1–2 defeat. Lestienne finished the 2024–25 AFC Champions League Two campaign as a runner-up with 5 goals, placing him in the joint top 5 goalscorer of the campaign.

As of 21 May 2025, after scoring and assisting in the first leg of the semi-final match against DPMM in the 2024–25 Singapore Cup, Lestienne made a total of 152 goals and assists (64 goals and 88 assists) after 166 games. Lestienne assisted the winning goal for Bart Ramselaar in a 1–0 against Tampines Rovers to seal the Singapore Cup final. Lion City Sailors completed a domestic treble including the Community Shield, the league title and the Singapore Cup. Lestienne was also named in the Team of the Year for the third season in a row.

==== 2025–2026 season ====
Lestienne started off the season with a defeat in the 2025 Singapore Community Shield against Tampines Rovers on 16 August 2025. However, in the first league match of the season, he scored a brace to help Lion City Sailors to a 2–1 win over Hougang United on 25 August. While in the opening group stage fixtures of the 2025–26 AFC Champions League Two against Indonesian club Persib Bandung, he assisted Lennart Thy to scored a header in stoppage time to secure a 1–1 draw at the Gelora Bandung Lautan Api Stadium.

On 12 December 2025, it was announced that Lestienne would be leaving the club at the end of December, following the expiry of his contract. During the first leg of the semi-final 2025–26 Singapore Cup fixtures against Balestier Khalsa on 14 December, Lestienne recorded a hat-trick of assist helping his team to a 4–1 win putting his assist tally to 96. In his penultimate game on 17 December, he registered a goal and an assist as the Sailors beat Myanmar's Shan United 3–2 in the ASEAN Club Championship. Lestienne captained the team on his final game in a 1–0 win in the Singapore Cup semi-final second leg against Balestier Khalsa. After 4 years at the club, Lestienne played 131 games racking a total of 70 goals and 97 assists. He was named legend of the club following his departure.

== International career ==
Lestienne has appeared seven times for the Belgium U21 team and scored once, when he converted a penalty in the 53rd minute in a 2015 UEFA European Under-21 Football Championship qualification Group 9 game against Cyprus U21 won by Belgium 2–0.

Lestienne was called up to the senior Belgium national team for the friendly against the United States in May 2013, but did not play. He wore the number 17 jersey on the match-day squad. He was called up again to the squad in November 2019 to play against Russia and Cyprus for Belgium last two UEFA Euro 2020 qualifying match which he didn't make any appearances.

== Style of play ==
Lestienne is a technically gifted winger who is primarily deployed on either flank, although he is most effective when starting on the right wing and cutting inside onto his stronger left foot. He is known for his direct attacking approach, frequently taking on defenders in one-on-one situations and using quick acceleration and close ball control to beat his marker. Lestienne employed his signature move by cutting inside on his stronger left foot to move to a more central attacking position, and used his agility and dribbling skills to take on defenders until he found the space to make an attempt on goal or become creative to cross the ball to the far post for his teammate to tap in for the goal.

A creative wide player, Lestienne contributes both goals and assists, combining dribbling with an eye for the final pass. His agility and balance allow him to operate effectively in tight spaces, while his movement into half-spaces increases his threat in the attacking third. Although not a traditional striker, he regularly arrives in scoring positions from wide areas and is capable of finishing from narrow angles, particularly with curling shots.

Tactically versatile, Lestienne can function as a traditional winger or as an inverted winger in systems such as 4-3-3 or 4-2-3-1, adapting his role depending on team needs. He is also a set-piece taker, providing quality deliveries from corners and free kicks. In addition to his attacking output, he contributes defensively by pressing opposition full-backs and tracking back when required.

== Career statistics ==
=== Club ===
As of match played 21 December 2025

Appearances and goals by club, season and competition
Club	Season	League			National cup		League cup		Continental		Other		Total	
Club	Season	Division	Apps	Goals	Apps	Goals	Apps	Goals	Apps	Goals	Apps	Goals	Apps	Goals
Mouscron	2008–09	Belgian First Division A	2	0	0	0	0	0	0	0	—		2	0
Mouscron	2009–10	Belgian First Division A	18	3	0	0	0	0	0	0	—		18	3
Mouscron	Total		20	3	0	0	0	0	0	0	0	0	20	3
Club Brugge	2009–10	Belgian First Division A	12	1	2	0	0	0	2 (Note: Appearance(s) in UEFA Europa League)	0	—		16	1
Club Brugge	2010–11	Belgian First Division A	15	2	2	0	0	0	3	0	—		20	2
Club Brugge	2011–12	Belgian First Division A	19	7	1	0	0	0	5	1	—		25	8
Club Brugge	2012–13	Belgian First Division A	38	17	2	0	0	0	7 (Note: One appearance in UEFA Champions League, six appearances and one goal in UEFA Europa League)	1	—		47	18
Club Brugge	2013–14	Belgian First Division A	39	11	2	0	0	0	1	0	—		42	11
Club Brugge	2014–15	Belgian First Division A	4	0	0	0	0	0	3	0	—		7	0
Club Brugge	Total		127	38	9	0	0	0	21	2	0	0	157	40
Al-Arabi SC	2014–15	Qatar Stars League	0	0	0	0	0	0	—		—		0	0
Genoa (loan)	2014–15	Serie A	23	1	1	0	0	0	—		—		24	1
PSV (loan)	2015–16	Eredivisie	14	1	1	0	0	0	4 (Note: Appearance(s) in UEFA Champions League)	2	—		19	3
Jong PSV (loan)	2015–16	Eerste Divisie	1	0	—		—		—		—		1	0
Rubin Kazan	2016–17	Russian Premier League	13	3	3	0	0	0	—		—		16	3
Rubin Kazan	2017–18	Russian Premier League	10	2	2	1	0	0	—		—		12	3
Rubin Kazan	Total		23	5	5	1	0	0	0	0	0	0	28	6
Málaga (loan)	2017–18	La Liga	12	0	0	0	0	0	—		—		12	0
Standard Liège	2018–19	Belgian First Division A	27	5	1	0	0	0	5	0	—		33	5
Standard Liège	2019–20	Belgian First Division A	27	7	2	1	0	0	5	2	—		34	10
Standard Liège	2020–21	Belgian First Division A	33	5	3	0	0	0	4	2	—		40	7
Standard Liège	2021–22	Belgian First Division A	8	0	0	0	0	0	—		—		8	0
Standard Liège	Total		95	17	6	1	0	0	14	4	0	0	115	22
Lion City Sailors	2022	Singapore Premier League	25	12	3	3	0	0	6 (Note: Appearance(s) in AFC Champions League Elite)	1	—		34	16
Lion City Sailors	2023	Singapore Premier League	24	25	5	0	0	0	6	1	—		35	26
Lion City Sailors	2024–25	Singapore Premier League	27	14	3	1	0	0	13 (Note: Appearance(s) in AFC Champions League Two)	5	6 (Note: Five appearances and one goal in ASEAN Club Championship, one appearance and one goal in Singapore Community Shield)	2	49	22
Lion City Sailors	2025–26	Singapore Premier League	4	4	2	0	0	0	4	0	3 (Note: Two appearances and two goals in ASEAN Club Championship, one appearance in Singapore Community Shield)	2	13	6
Lion City Sailors	Total		80	55	13	4	0	0	29	7	9	4	131	70
Career total			395	120	35	6	0	0	68	15	9	4	507	145

== Honours ==
PSV

- Eredivisie: 2015–16
- Johan Cruyff Shield: 2015

Lion City Sailors

- AFC Champions League Two runner-up: 2024–25
- Singapore Premier League: 2024–25
- Singapore Cup: 2023, 2024–25, 2025-26
- Singapore Community Shield: 2022, 2024; runner-up: 2025

Individual

- Singapore Premier League 'Player of the Year': 2023
- Singapore Premier League 'Team of the Year': 2022, 2023, 2024–25
- Singapore Premier League 'Top Goalscorer': 2023
- Singapore Premier League 'Top Assist provider': 2022, 2023, 2024–25
- Singapore Premier League 'Player of the Month': May 2022, August 2022, April/May 2023, June 2023
