= Moritz Bauer =

Austrian footballer (born 1992)

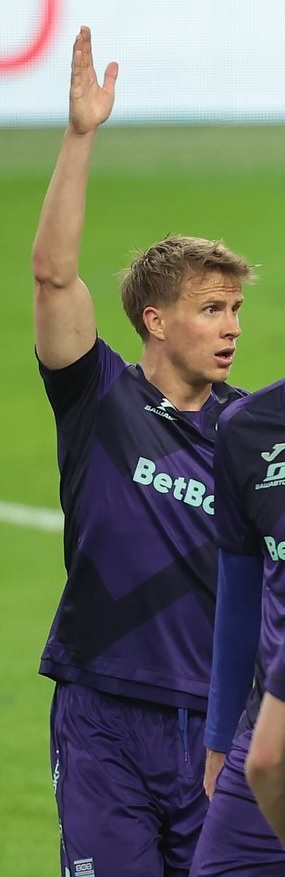
- Bauer with FC Ufa in 2021

Personal information
- Full name: Moritz Bauer
- Date of birth: 25 January 1992 (age 34)
- Place of birth: Winterthur, Switzerland
- Height: 1.81 m (5 ft 11 in)
- Positions: Right midfielder; right back

Youth career
- 2003–2004: SC Veltheim
- 2004–2006: Grasshopper Club Zürich
- 2006–2009: FC Winterthur

Senior career*
| Years | Team | Apps | (Gls) |
| 2009–2010 | FC Winterthur II | 4 | (0) |
| 2011–2014 | Grasshoppers II | 47 | (0) |
| 2011–2016 | Grasshoppers | 93 | (0) |
| 2016–2018 | Rubin Kazan | 37 | (0) |
| 2018–2021 | Stoke City | 23 | (0) |
| 2019–2020 | → Celtic (loan) | 9 | (0) |
| 2021 | → FC Ufa (loan) | 7 | (0) |
| 2021–2022 | FC Ufa | 9 | (0) |
| 2022–2023 | Servette | 25 | (1) |

International career
| 2010 | Switzerland U-19 | 1 | (0) |
| 2013 | Switzerland U-21 | 3 | (0) |
| 2017–2018 | Austria | 6 | (0) |
- * Club domestic league appearances and goals

Moritz Bauer (German pronunciation: [ˈmoːʁɪts ˈbaʊ̯ɐ]; born 25 January 1992) is an Austrian former footballer who played as a right midfielder or a right back.

Bauer began his career in the Swiss Super League with Grasshopper Club Zürich. He spent five seasons at Letzigrund making over 100 appearances for Grasshoppers before joining Russian Premier League club Rubin Kazan June 2016. After two years playing in Russia, Bauer signed for English club Stoke City in January 2018.

== Club career ==
=== Early career ===
Bauer began playing football with the youth teams at SC Veltheim, Grasshopper Club Zürich and FC Winterthur.

=== Grasshopper Club Zürich ===
A youth exponent from Grasshopper Club Zürich, Bauer made his Swiss Super League debut on 14 August 2011 against BSC Young Boys playing the full game which ended in a 3–0 defeat. Bauer became a regular at Letzigrund, making 102 appearances in five years with the Swiss Super League side.

=== Rubin Kazan ===
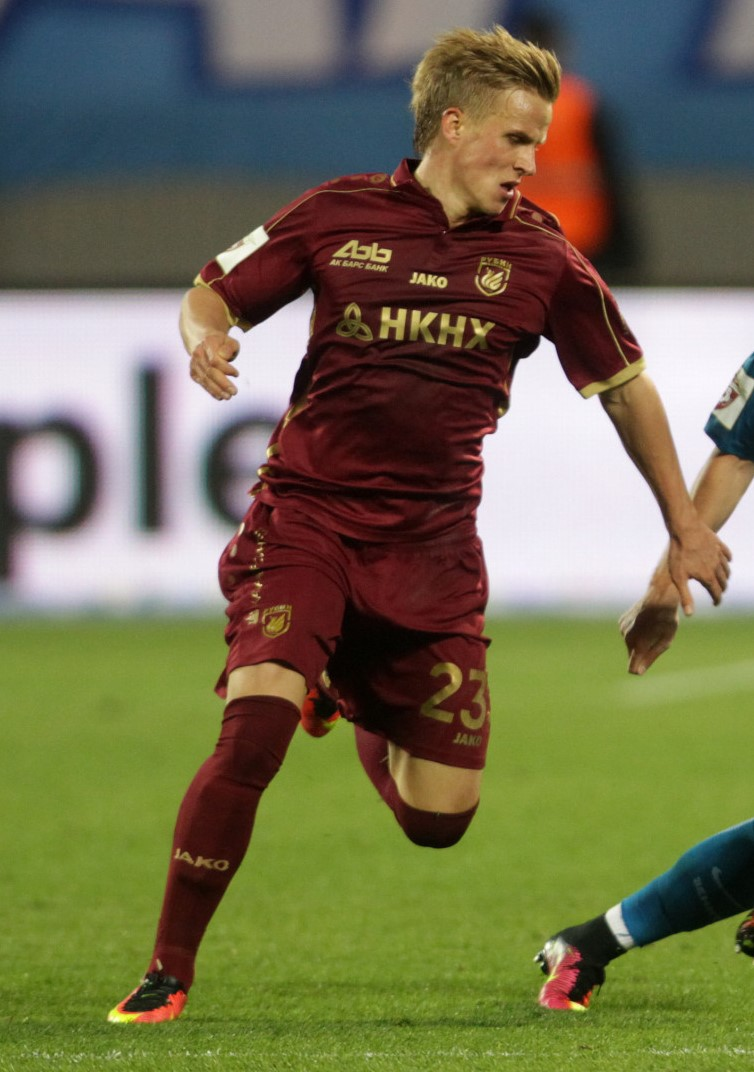
Bauer in 2016

In June 2016, Bauer signed for Russian Premier League club Rubin Kazan. He established himself as first choice right back under Javi Gracia and played 23 times in 2016–17 as Rubin finished in ninth position. He became a popular player with the Rubin Kazan supporters who voted Bauer as their player-of the year for 2017. With Rubin struggling financially in 2017–18 Bauer was free to find another club.

=== Stoke City ===
On 9 January 2018, Bauer signed a four-and-a-half-year contract with Premier League club Stoke City. Bauer played 15 times in 2017–18 as Stoke were relegated to the EFL Championship. Despite relegation Bauer admitted that he would be willing to remain with the club. Bauer signed a new five-year contract with the Potters in July 2018. Bauer began the first two games of the 2018–19 away at Leeds United and at home to Brentford but was then dropped from the team by Gary Rowett. It wasn't until Nathan Jones became manager in January 2019, that Bauer started another Championship match, a 2–1 win over Leeds. He failed to retain his place in the side under Jones for the remainder of the campaign and speaking in March 2019 Bauer admitted that he was looking for a new challenge.

==== Loan to Celtic ====
On 28 August 2019, Bauer joined Scottish Premiership side Celtic on loan for the 2019–20 season with the option to purchase. Bauer made his Celtic debut in a 2–0 Old Firm victory over Rangers at Ibrox on 1 September 2019 where he was on the receiving end of a strong tackle from Jordan Jones who was sent-off. Bauer struggled to establish himself in Neil Lennon's plans and by February his place in the team was taken by Jeremie Frimpong. He played 13 matches for Celtic as they won a ninth consecutive Scottish Premiership title as the season was ended early in May 2020 due to the COVID-19 pandemic.

==== FC Ufa ====
On his return to Stoke, Bauer was left out of the first team by Michael O'Neill and was loaned to Russian side FC Ufa in February 2021. He moved to Ufa on a permanent basis on 1 July 2021.

=== Servette ===
On 25 January 2022, he signed a contract with Servette until 2023.

== International career ==
Bauer was born in Switzerland, and has Austrian citizenship through his Austrian father. He was eligible for the Swiss and Austrian national teams and represented Switzerland at junior international levels.

Bauer got his first call up to the senior Austria team for the 2018 FIFA World Cup qualifiers against Wales and Georgia in September 2017. He made his debut for Austria in the tie with Georgia on 5 September 2017, a 1–1 draw.

== Personal life ==
Off the pitch Bauer has a number of hobbies. He is a qualified pilot and regularly flies propeller aeroplanes during his breaks from football. He can also play the piano and is a polyglot, speaking five languages: French, German, English, Spanish and a basic level of Russian, which he picked up quickly by living with a Russian family and made him a big favourite among Rubin fans.

== Career statistics ==
=== Club ===
As of match played 3 October 2021

Appearances and goals by club, season and competition
| Club | Season | League | | | National Cup | | League Cup | | Other | | Total | |
| Club | Season | Division | Apps | Goals | Apps | Goals | Apps | Goals | Apps | Goals | Apps | Goals |
|---|---|---|---|---|---|---|---|---|---|---|---|---|
| Grasshopper Club Zürich | 2011–12 | Swiss Super League | 16 | 0 | 1 | 0 | — | | — | | 17 | 0 |
| Grasshopper Club Zürich | 2012–13 | Swiss Super League | 13 | 0 | 2 | 0 | — | | — | | 15 | 0 |
| Grasshopper Club Zürich | 2013–14 | Swiss Super League | 15 | 0 | 3 | 0 | — | | 0 | 0 | 18 | 0 |
| Grasshopper Club Zürich | 2014–15 | Swiss Super League | 16 | 0 | 1 | 0 | — | | 1 (Note: Appearances in UEFA Champions League) | 0 | 18 | 0 |
| Grasshopper Club Zürich | 2015–16 | Swiss Super League | 33 | 0 | 1 | 0 | — | | — | | 34 | 0 |
| Grasshopper Club Zürich | Total | | 93 | 0 | 8 | 0 | — | | 1 | 0 | 102 | 0 |
| Rubin Kazan | 2016–17 | Russian Premier League | 21 | 0 | 2 | 0 | — | | — | | 23 | 0 |
| Rubin Kazan | 2017–18 | Russian Premier League | 16 | 0 | 2 | 0 | — | | — | | 18 | 0 |
| Rubin Kazan | Total | | 37 | 0 | 4 | 0 | — | | — | | 41 | 0 |
| Stoke City | 2017–18 | Premier League | 15 | 0 | 0 | 0 | 0 | 0 | — | | 15 | 0 |
| Stoke City | 2018–19 | Championship | 8 | 0 | 1 | 0 | 2 | 0 | — | | 11 | 0 |
| Stoke City | 2019–20 | Championship | 0 | 0 | 0 | 0 | 0 | 0 | — | | 0 | 0 |
| Stoke City | 2020–21 | Championship | 0 | 0 | 0 | 0 | 0 | 0 | — | | 0 | 0 |
| Stoke City | Total | | 23 | 0 | 1 | 0 | 2 | 0 | — | | 26 | 0 |
| Stoke City U23 | 2018–19 | — | — | | — | | — | | 1 (Note: Appearances in EFL Trophy) | 0 | 1 | 0 |
| Celtic (loan) | 2019–20 | Scottish Premiership | 9 | 0 | 1 | 0 | 0 | 0 | 3 (Note: Appearances in UEFA Europa League) | 0 | 13 | 0 |
| FC Ufa (loan) | 2020–21 | Russian Premier League | 7 | 0 | 1 | 0 | — | | — | | 8 | 0 |
| FC Ufa | 2021–22 | Russian Premier League | 9 | 0 | 1 | 0 | — | | — | | 10 | 0 |
| FC Ufa | Total | | 16 | 0 | 2 | 0 | — | | — | | 18 | 0 |
| Career total | | | 178 | 0 | 16 | 0 | 2 | 0 | 5 | 0 | 201 | 0 |

=== International ===
As of match played 14 November 2017

| National team | Year | Apps | Goals |
|---|---|---|---|
Austria
| Austria | 2017 | 4 | 0 |
| Austria | 2018 | 2 | 0 |
| Total | | 6 | 0 |

== Honours ==
Grasshopper

- Swiss Cup: 2012–13

Celtic

- Scottish Premiership: 2019–20
- Scottish League Cup: 2019–20
