= Yohan M'Vila =

Footballer (born 1988)

Personal information
- Date of birth: 8 October 1988 (age 38)
- Place of birth: Amiens, France
- Height: 1.83 m (6 ft 0 in)
- Position: Midfielder

Youth career
- Ajaccio

Senior career*
Years	Team	Apps	(Gls)
2006–2008	Ajaccio	7	(0)
2008–2010	Dijon	20	(0)
2011–2012	Olympic Charleroi		
2012–2013	Mantes		
- * Club domestic league appearances and goals

Yohan M'Vila (born 8 October 1988) is a French former professional footballer who played as a midfielder. He is the older brother of Yann M'Vila.

== Club career ==
M'Vila left Ligue 2 club Dijon in 2010. He eventually joined Belgian club Olympic Charleroi. In 2014, following his professional retirement, M'Vila joined amateur club US Liffré.

== International career ==
He has been called up to the Congo national squad, but has yet to make his debut.

== Personal life ==
His younger brother is Yann M'Vila, who is a former France international.
