= Aleksandr Tsiberkin =

Russian footballer (born 2000)

Personal information
- Full name: Aleksandr Vladislavovich Tsiberkin
- Date of birth: 23 March 2000 (age 26)
- Place of birth: Bugulma, Russia
- Height: 1.81 m (5 ft 11 in)
- Position: Midfielder

Youth career
- –2012: DYuSSh-2 Bugulma
- 2012–2015: Konoplyov football academy
- 2017: Rubin Kazan

Senior career*
Years	Team	Apps	(Gls)
2017–2020	Rubin Kazan	0	(0)
2020	Dynamo Bryansk	7	(0)
2021–2022	Biolog-Novokubansk	46	(7)
2023	Sokol Kazan (amateur)		
2024–2025	Sokol Kazan	32	(3)

International career^{‡}
2019	Russia U19	1	(0)
- * Club domestic league appearances and goals as of 19 May 2025 ‡ National team caps and goals as of 22 February 2019

Aleksandr Vladislavovich Tsiberkin (Russian: Александр Владиславович Циберкин; born 23 March 2000) is a Russian football player.

== Club career ==
Tsiberkin made his debut in the Russian Football National League for Dynamo Bryansk on 19 September 2020 in a game against Tekstilshchik Ivanovo.

On 29 May 2025, Tsiberkin was banned for 10 years from any football activity for illegal betting by the Russian Football Union.
