= Dmitri Kamenshchikov =

Russian association football player

Personal information
- Full name: Dmitri Sergeyevich Kamenshchikov
- Date of birth: 27 August 1998 (age 28)
- Place of birth: Naberezhnye Chelny, Russia
- Height: 1.82 m (6 ft 0 in)
- Position: Forward

Team information
- Current team: Chelyabinsk
- Number: 99

Youth career
- –2013: KAMAZ Naberezhnye Chelny
- 2013–2015: Rubin Kazan

Senior career*
Years	Team	Apps	(Gls)
2015–2018	Rubin Kazan	0	(0)
2017–2018	→ Neftekhimik Nizhnekamsk (loan)	16	(5)
2018	Neftekhimik Nizhnekamsk	9	(2)
2019	KAMAZ Naberezhnye Chelny	9	(3)
2019–2020	Khimki	18	(2)
2019–2020	Khimki-M	5	(2)
2020	Tom Tomsk	18	(0)
2021	Tekstilshchik Ivanovo	15	(1)
2021–2023	SKA Rostov-on-Don	51	(18)
2023–2024	Kaluga	34	(19)
2024–2026	Volga Ulyanovsk	68	(23)
2026–	Chelyabinsk	0	(0)

International career
2013–2014	Russia U-16	10	(0)
2016	Russia U-18	14	(4)
2018	Russia U-20	2	(0)
- * Club domestic league appearances and goals as of 16 May 2026

Dmitri Sergeyevich Kamenshchikov (Russian: Дмитрий Сергеевич Каменщиков; born 27 August 1998) is a Russian football player who plays for Chelyabinsk.

== Club career ==
He played his first game for the main squad of Rubin Kazan on 24 September 2015 in a Russian Cup game against SKA-Energiya Khabarovsk which his team lost 0–2.

He made his Russian Football National League debut for Khimki on 7 July 2019 in a game against Luch Vladivostok and scored on his debut.
