= Daniil Makeyev =

Russian footballer

Personal information
- Full name: Daniil Igorevich Makeyev
- Date of birth: 30 July 1998 (age 28)
- Place of birth: Moscow, Russia
- Height: 1.82 m (6 ft 0 in)
- Positions: Midfielder; forward

Youth career
- FC Spartak Moscow
- 2016: FC Khimki
- 2016–2018: FC Rubin Kazan

Senior career*
Years	Team	Apps	(Gls)
2019–2021	FC Zenit-2 Saint Petersburg	15	(0)
2021	DFK Dainava	10	(1)
2021	FC Yessentuki	9	(0)
- * Club domestic league appearances and goals

Daniil Igorevich Makeyev (Russian: Даниил Игоревич Макеев; born 30 July 1998) is a Russian former football player.

== Club career ==
He made his debut in the Russian Football National League for FC Zenit-2 Saint Petersburg on 11 March 2019 in a game against FC Spartak-2 Moscow.
