= Ilya Shabanov =

Russian footballer

Personal information
- Full name: Ilya Vladimirovich Shabanov
- Date of birth: 13 April 1997 (age 29)
- Place of birth: Naberezhnye Chelny, Tatarstan, Russia
- Height: 1.87 m (6 ft 2 in)
- Position: Centre back

Youth career
- –2013: KAMAZ Naberezhnye Chelny
- 2013–2015: Rubin Kazan

Senior career*
Years	Team	Apps	(Gls)
2015–2018	Rubin Kazan	0	(0)
2018	Syzran-2003	1	(0)
2019	Vlašim	16	(0)
2020	Lokomotiv Gomel	19	(5)
2021	Slavia Mozyr	8	(0)
2021–2022	Amkar Perm	13	(2)
2022–2023	Zenit Izhevsk	6	(0)
2024	FC Alabuga (amateur)		
- * Club domestic league appearances and goals

Ilya Vladimirovich Shabanov (Russian: Илья Владимирович Шабанов; born 13 April 1997) is a Russian former football player.

== Club career ==
He made his debut in the Russian Professional Football League for FC Syzran-2003 on 22 September 2018 in a game against FC Lada-Tolyatti.
