= Adil Mukhametzyanov =

Russian footballer

Personal information
- Full name: Adil Rashshatovich Mukhametzyanov
- Date of birth: 15 March 1998 (age 28)
- Place of birth: Kazan, Russia
- Height: 1.82 m (5 ft 11 1/2 in)
- Position: Midfielder

Senior career*
Years	Team	Apps	(Gls)
2016–2017	FC Rubin Kazan	0	(0)
2017	FC Anzhi-Yunior Zelenodolsk	14	(0)
2018–2019	FC Rubin Kazan	0	(0)
2019–2020	FC Tekstilshchik Ivanovo	39	(1)
2021–2023	FC Nefis Kazan (amateur)		
2023–2024	FC Rubin-2 Kazan	36	(0)
- * Club domestic league appearances and goals as of 19 October 2024

Adil Rashshatovich Mukhametzyanov (Tatar: Гадил Рашат улы Мөхәммәтҗанов, romanized: Ğadil Raşat ulı Möxämmätcanof, Russian: Адиль Рашшатович Мухаметзянов; born 15 March 1998) is a Russian football player.

== Club career ==
He made his debut in the Russian Professional Football League for FC Anzhi-Yunior Zelenodolsk on 3 August 2017 in a game against FC Krylia Sovetov-2 Samara.

On 30 May 2019, his FC Rubin Kazan contract was dissolved by mutual consent.

He made his Russian Football National League debut for FC Tekstilshchik Ivanovo on 7 July 2019 in a game against FC Yenisey Krasnoyarsk.
