= Ilya Gilyazutdinov =

Russian footballer

Personal information
- Full name: Ilya Uralovich Gilyazutdinov
- Date of birth: 8 January 1998 (age 28)
- Place of birth: Pecherskiye Vyselki, Russia
- Height: 1.78 m (5 ft 10 in)
- Position: Midfielder

Senior career*
Years	Team	Apps	(Gls)
2016–2018	FC Rubin Kazan	0	(0)
2019	Vlašim	2	(0)
2019–2020	FC Irtysh Omsk	4	(0)
2020	FC Tver	7	(1)
2021	FC Rodina Moscow	0	(0)
2021	FC Volga Ulyanovsk	2	(0)
2022	FC Kaluga	2	(0)
- * Club domestic league appearances and goals as of 5 June 2022

Ilya Uralovich Gilyazutdinov (Russian: Илья Уралович Гилязутдинов; born 8 January 1998) is a Russian football player.

== Club career ==
He made his debut in the Russian Professional Football League for FC Irtysh Omsk on 14 August 2019 in a game against FC Zenit Irkutsk.
