= 2006–07 Sheffield United F.C. season =

Sheffield United
2006–07 season
- Chairman: Terry Robinson
- Manager: Neil Warnock
- Stadium: Bramall Lane
- FA Premier League: 18th (relegated)
- FA Cup: Third round
- League Cup: Third round
- Top goalscorer: Hulse (8)
- Highest home attendance: 32,604 (vs. Wigan Athletic)
- Lowest home attendance: 27,368 (vs. Charlton Athletic)
- Average home league attendance: 30,684

During the 2006–07 English football season, Sheffield United competed in the FA Premier League, after being promoted from the Football League Championship the previous season.

== Kit ==
The kit was manufactured by French company Le Coq Sportif and sponsored by American bank Capital One.

== Season summary ==
Several good results, including a home draw against Liverpool on the first day of the season and wins over Arsenal and Newcastle United saw Sheffield United keep ahead of the relegation zone for much of the season. However, West Ham United's late run of good form, combined with a broken leg suffered by top scorer Rob Hulse against Chelsea that left the Blades lacking firepower up front, saw Sheffield United sucked into the relegation battle and they were relegated on the final day of the season on goal difference after losing at home to Wigan Athletic; a draw would have been good enough to keep United up. Wigan Athletic's win kept them up at United's expense and in a twist of fate, David Unsworth, who had started the season at Sheffield United and had been let go in January 2007 on a free transfer, scored the goal that sent down former club Sheffield United, whilst simultaneously saving Wigan Athletic from relegation, 3 minutes after arriving on the pitch as substitute.

== Players ==
=== First-team squad ===
Squad at end of season

Note: Flags indicate national team as defined under FIFA eligibility rules; some limited exceptions apply. Players may hold more than one non-FIFA nationality.

No.	Pos.	Nation	Player
1	GK	IRL	Paddy Kenny (Note: Kenny was born in Halifax, England, but also qualified to represent the Republic of Ireland internationally through his parents and made his international debut for the Republic of Ireland in June 2004.)
2	DF	ENG	Leigh Bromby
4	DF	JAM	Claude Davis
5	DF	ENG	Chris Morgan (captain)
6	MF	ENG	Phil Jagielka (vice captain)
7	FW	JAM	Luton Shelton
8	FW	ENG	Jon Stead
9	FW	ENG	Rob Hulse
10	FW	ENG	Danny Webber
12	MF	IRL	Alan Quinn
13	GK	ENG	Ian Bennett
14	DF	GLP	David Sommeil
15	DF	ENG	Rob Kozluk
16	DF	ENG	Matthew Kilgallon
17	MF	SCO	Nick Montgomery (Note: Montgomery was born in Leeds, England, but also qualified to represent Scotland internationally and represented them at U-21 level.)
18	MF	ENG	Michael Tonge
19	MF	NIR	Keith Gillespie
20	DF	ENG	Chris Armstrong

No.	Pos.	Nation	Player
21	MF	ATG	Mikele Leigertwood (Note: Leigertwood was born in Enfield, England, but also qualified to represent Antigua and Barbuda internationally and would make his international debut for Antigua and Barbuda in November 2008.)
22	DF	ENG	Chris Lucketti
23	MF	EGY	Ahmed Fathy
24	DF	ENG	Craig Short
25	DF	ENG	Alan Wright
26	DF	IRL	Derek Geary
27	FW	FRA	Christian Nadé
28	MF	IRL	Stephen Quinn
29	GK	ENG	Paul Gerrard
30	MF	CHN	Li Tie
31	MF	ENG	Nicky Law
32	FW	TUR	Colin Kazim-Richards (Note: Kazim-Richards was born in Waltham Forest, England, but also qualified to represent Antigua and Barbuda through his father and Turkey through his mother and made his international debut for Turkey in March 2007.)
33	GK	ENG	Jamie Annerson
34	MF	ENG	James Ashmore
37	FW	ENG	Colin Marrison
38	MF	ENG	Kevan Hurst
39	DF	SEN	Mamadou Seck
44	MF	IRN	Sharu Naraji (Note: Naraji was born in Bolton, England, but was raised in Iran and represented them at U-20 level.)

=== Left club during season ===
Note: Flags indicate national team as defined under FIFA eligibility rules; some limited exceptions apply. Players may hold more than one non-FIFA nationality.

No.	Pos.	Nation	Player
3	DF	ENG	David Unsworth (to Wigan Athletic)
7	MF	BRB	Paul Ifill (Note: Ifill was born in Brighton, England, but also qualified to represent Barbados internationally through his parents and made his international debut for Barbados in June 2004.) (to Crystal Palace)
8	FW	NGA	Ade Akinbiyi (Note: Akinbiyi was born in Hackney, England, but also qualified to represent Nigeria internationally through his parents and made his international debut for Nigeria in 1999.) (to Burnley)

No.	Pos.	Nation	Player
11	FW	ENG	Steve Kabba (to Watford)
23	FW	ENG	Neil Shipperley (to Brentford)

=== Reserve squad ===
The following players did not appear for the first-team this season.

Note: Flags indicate national team as defined under FIFA eligibility rules; some limited exceptions apply. Players may hold more than one non-FIFA nationality.

No. / Pos. / Nation / Player; 44 / MF / CAN / Ryan Gyaki	No. / Pos. / Nation / Player; — / DF / ENG / Travis Binnion

== Transfers ==
=== In ===
- (France) David Sommeil - (England) Manchester City, free transfer, 24 May 2006
- (Jamaica) Claude Davis - (England) Preston North End, £3,000,000, 14 June 2006
- (France) Christian Nadé - (France) Troyes, 27 June 2006
- (England) Mikele Leigertwood - (England) Crystal Palace, £600,000 (compensation), 4 July 2006
- (China) Li Tie - (England) Everton, free transfer, 6 July 2006
- (England) Rob Hulse - (England) Leeds United, £2,200,000 rising to £3,000,000, 24 July 2006
- (England) Ian Bennett - (England) Leeds United, undisclosed, 27 July 2006
- (Turkey) Colin Kazim-Richards - (England) Brighton & Hove Albion, £150,000, 31 August 2006
- (England) Paul Gerrard - (England) Nottingham Forest, free transfer, 27 September 2006
- (England) Matthew Kilgallon - (England) Leeds United, £1,750,000 rising to £2,000,000, 8 January 2007
- (England) Jon Stead - Sunderland, £750,000 rising to £1,250,000, 11 January 2007
- (Senegal) Mamadou Seck - (France) Le Havre, free, 15 January 2007
- (Jamaica) Luton Shelton - (Sweden) Helsingborg, £2,000,000, 15 January 2007
- (Egypt) Ahmed Fathy - (Egypt) Ismaily SC, £700,000, 24 January 2007

=== Out ===
- (England) Brian Deane - retired, 2006
- (England) Garry Flitcroft - retired, 2006
- (England) Kyle Nix (Note: Nix was born in Sydney, Australia, but was raised in England and represented them at U-16, U-18, U-20, and C level.) - released
- (Republic of Ireland) Gary Mulligan - (England) Gillingham, 12 May 2006
- (England) Bruce Dyer - released (later joined (England) Doncaster Rovers on 2 June 2006)
- (England) Simon Francis - (England) Southend United, undisclosed, 13 June 2006
- (England) Phil Barnes - (England) Grimsby Town, undisclosed, 29 June 2006
- (England) Luke Beckett - (England) Huddersfield Town, £85,000, 3 July 2006
- (Nigeria) Ade Akinbiyi - (England) Burnley, £650,000 rising to £750,000, 1 January 2007
- (England) David Unsworth - (England) Wigan Athletic, free transfer, 5 January 2007
- (Barbados) Paul Ifill - (England) Crystal Palace, £800,000, 8 January 2007
- (England) Neil Shipperley - released (later joined (England) Brentford), 15 January 2007
- (England) Steve Kabba - (England) Watford, £500,000, 26 January 2007

== Final league table ==
Pos	Team	Pld	W	D	L	GF	GA	GD	Pts	Qualification or relegation
16	Fulham	38	8	15	15	38	60	−22	39	
17	Wigan Athletic	38	10	8	20	37	59	−22	38	
18	Sheffield United (R)	38	10	8	20	32	55	−23	38	Relegation to Football League Championship
19	Charlton Athletic (R)	38	8	10	20	34	60	−26	34	Relegation to Football League Championship
20	Watford (R)	38	5	13	20	29	59	−30	28	Relegation to Football League Championship

Source: Barclays Premier League
Rules for classification: 1) points; 2) goal difference; 3) number of goals scored.
(R) Relegated

== Results ==
Sheffield United's score comes first

=== Legend ===
Win	Draw	Loss

=== FA Premier League ===
==== Results summary ====
Overall								Home						Away					
Pld	W	D	L	GF	GA	GD	Pts	W	D	L	GF	GA	GD	W	D	L	GF	GA	GD
38	10	8	20	32	55	−23	38	7	6	6	24	21	+3	3	2	14	8	34	−26

Last updated: 25 January 2019.
Source: 11v11

==== Results per matchday ====
Matchday	1	2	3	4	5	6	7	8	9	10	11	12	13	14	15	16	17	18	19	20	21	22	23	24	25	26	27	28	29	30	31	32	33	34	35	36	37	38
Ground	H	A	A	H	H	A	H	A	A	H	A	H	H	A	A	H	H	A	A	H	H	A	H	A	H	A	H	A	H	A	A	H	H	A	A	H	A	H
Result	D	L	L	D	L	L	W	D	L	L	W	D	L	L	W	W	D	W	L	L	W	L	D	L	W	L	W	L	D	L	L	L	W	L	D	W	L	L
Position	10	14	20	18	19	20	17	16	17	18	17	17	18	18	18	16	16	14	16	17	15	16	16	16	16	16	15	16	16	17	17	18	17	17	17	15	16	18

Updated to match(es) played on 13 May 2007. Source: Statto.com
A = Away; H = Home; W = Win; D = Draw; L = Loss

Date	Opponent	Venue	Result	Attendance	Scorers
19 August 2006	Liverpool	H	1–1	31,726	Hulse
22 August 2006	Tottenham Hotspur	A	0–2	35,287	
26 August 2006	Fulham	A	0–1	18,362	
9 September 2006	Blackburn Rovers	H	0–0	29,876	
16 September 2006	Reading	H	1–2	28,288	Hulse
23 September 2006	Arsenal	A	0–3	59,912	
30 September 2006	Middlesbrough	H	2–1	27,483	Hulse, Jagielka
14 October 2006	Manchester City	A	0–0	42,192	
21 October 2006	Everton	A	0–2	37,900	
28 October 2006	Chelsea	H	0–2	32,321	
4 November 2006	Newcastle United	A	1–0	50,188	Webber
11 November 2006	Bolton Wanderers	H	2–2	28,294	Hulse, Kazim-Richards
18 November 2006	Manchester United	H	1–2	32,584	Gillespie
25 November 2006	West Ham United	A	0–1	34,454	
28 November 2006	Watford	A	1–0	18,887	Webber
2 December 2006	Charlton Athletic	H	2–1	27,368	Morgan, Gillespie
11 December 2006	Aston Villa	H	2–2	30,957	Quinn, Webber
16 December 2006	Wigan Athletic	A	1–0	16,322	Hulse
23 December 2006	Portsmouth	A	1–3	20,164	Hulse
26 December 2006	Manchester City	H	0–1	32,591	
30 December 2006	Arsenal	H	1–0	32,086	Nadé
1 January 2007	Middlesbrough	A	1–3	27,963	Jagielka (pen)
13 January 2007	Portsmouth	H	1–1	30,269	Quinn
20 January 2007	Reading	A	1–3	23,956	Nadé
30 January 2007	Fulham	H	2–0	27,540	Stead, Tonge
3 February 2007	Blackburn Rovers	A	1–2	20,917	Stead
10 February 2007	Tottenham Hotspur	H	2–1	32,144	Hulse, Jagielka (pen)
24 February 2007	Liverpool	A	0–4	44,198	
3 March 2007	Everton	H	1–1	32,019	Hulse
17 March 2007	Chelsea	A	0–3	41,897	
31 March 2007	Bolton Wanderers	A	0–1	24,312	
7 April 2007	Newcastle United	H	1–2	32,572	Nadé
14 April 2007	West Ham United	H	3–0	31,593	Tonge, Jagielka, Stead
17 April 2007	Manchester United	A	0–2	75,540	
21 April 2007	Charlton Athletic	A	1–1	27,111	Stead
28 April 2007	Watford	H	1–0	30,690	Powell (own goal)
5 May 2007	Aston Villa	A	0–3	42,551	
13 May 2007	Wigan Athletic	H	1–2	32,604	Stead

=== FA Cup ===
Round	Date	Opponent	Venue	Result	Attendance	Goalscorers
R3	6 January 2007	Swansea City	H	0–3	15,896	

=== League Cup ===
Round	Date	Opponent	Venue	Result	Attendance	Goalscorers
R2	19 September 2006	Bury	H	1–0	6,273	Nadé
R3	24 October 2006	Birmingham City	H	2–4	10,584	Akinbiyi, Montgomery

== Statistics ==
=== Appearances and goals ===
No.	Pos	Nat	Player	Total		Premier League		FA Cup		League Cup	
No.	Pos	Nat	Player	Apps	Goals	Apps	Goals	Apps	Goals	Apps	Goals
Goalkeepers
1	GK	(Republic of Ireland) IRL	Paddy Kenny	34	0	34	0	0	0	0	0
13	GK	(England) ENG	Ian Bennett	4	0	2	0	0	0	2	0
29	GK	(England) ENG	Paul Gerrard	3	0	2	0	1	0	0	0
Defenders
2	DF	(England) ENG	Leigh Bromby	20	0	12+5	0	1	0	2	0
4	DF	(Jamaica) JAM	Claude Davis	22	0	18+3	0	0	0	1	0
5	DF	(England) ENG	Chris Morgan	25	1	21+3	1	0	0	1	0
6	DF	(England) ENG	Phil Jagielka	38	4	38	4	0	0	0	0
14	DF	(France) FRA	David Sommeil	7	0	4+1	0	1	0	1	0
15	DF	(England) ENG	Rob Kozluk	20	0	17+2	0	0	0	1	0
16	DF	(England) ENG	Matthew Kilgallon	6	0	6	0	0	0	0	0
20	DF	(England) ENG	Chris Armstrong	28	0	24+3	0	1	0	0	0
22	DF	(England) ENG	Chris Lucketti	9	0	8	0	0	0	0+1	0
24	DF	(England) ENG	Craig Short	2	0	0	0	0	0	2	0
25	DF	(England) ENG	Alan Wright	2	0	1	0	0	0	1	0
26	DF	(England) ENG	Derek Geary	28	0	26	0	1	0	0+1	0
Midfielders
12	MF	(Republic of Ireland) IRL	Alan Quinn	21	0	11+8	0	1	0	1	0
17	MF	(Scotland) SCO	Nick Montgomery	28	1	22+4	0	1	0	1	1
18	MF	(England) ENG	Michael Tonge	28	3	23+4	3	0+1	0	0	0
19	MF	(Northern Ireland) NIR	Keith Gillespie	31	3	27+4	3	0	0	0	0
21	MF	(England) ENG	Mikele Leigertwood	19	0	16+3	0	0	0	0	0
23	MF	(Egypt) EGY	Ahmed Fathy	3	0	2+1	0	0	0	0	0
23	MF	(England) ENG	Kevan Hurst	1	0	0	0	1	0	0	0
28	MF	(Republic of Ireland) IRL	Stephen Quinn	17	2	15	2	0+1	0	0+1	0
30	MF	(China) CHN	Li Tie	1	0	0	0	0	0	1	0
31	MF	(England) ENG	Nicky Law	7	0	2+2	0	0+1	0	2	0
Forwards
7	FW	(Jamaica) JAM	Luton Shelton	4	0	2+2	0	0	0	0	0
8	FW	(England) ENG	Jon Stead	14	4	12+2	4	0	0	0	0
9	FW	(England) ENG	Rob Hulse	29	8	28+1	8	0	0	0	0
10	FW	(England) ENG	Danny Webber	24	3	13+9	3	1	0	1	0
27	FW	(France) FRA	Christian Nadé	28	4	7+18	3	1	0	1+1	1
32	FW	(Turkey) TUR	Colin Kazim-Richards	29	1	15+12	1	0+1	0	1	0
37	FW	(England) ENG	Colin Marrison	1	0	0	0	0	0	0+1	0
Players transferred out during the season
3	DF	(England) ENG	David Unsworth	6	0	5	0	0	0	1	0
7	MF	(England) ENG	Paul Ifill	4	0	3	0	0	0	1	0
8	FW	(Nigeria) NGA	Ade Akinbiyi	5	1	2+1	0	0	0	2	1
11	FW	(England) ENG	Steve Kabba	8	0	0+7	0	0	0	1	0

Last updated: 19 May 2007
Source: Competitions
