= Dominic Roma =

English footballer (born 1985)

Personal information
- Date of birth: 29 November 1985 (age 40)
- Place of birth: Sheffield, England
- Position: Defender

Team information
- Current team: North Ferriby

Senior career*
| Years | Team | Apps | (Gls) |
| 2004–2007 | Sheffield United | 1 | (0) |
| 2005 | → Boston United (loan) | 6 | (0) |
| 2006 | → Hinckley United (loan) | 1 | (0) |
| 2006 | → Tamworth (loan) | 30 | (0) |
| 2007–2009 | Hinckley United | 94 | (4) |
| 2009 | Alfreton Town | 19 | (0) |
| 2010 | Harrogate Town | 40 | (0) |
| 2011–2017 | Gainsborough Trinity | 207 | (4) |
| 2017–2024 | Basford United | 245 | (0) |
| 2019 | → Scarborough Athletic (loan) | 22 | (0) |
| 2024– | North Ferriby | 60 | (0) |

Managerial career
- 2016–2017: Gainsborough Trinity
- * Club domestic league appearances and goals

Dominic Mark Roma (born 29 November 1985) is an English footballer and coach who plays as a defender for Northern Premier League Division One East club North Ferriby.

He has played in the Football League for both Sheffield United and Boston United. He has also played for Hinckley United, Tamworth, Alfreton Town, Harrogate Town and Scarborough Athletic. He most notably played for Gainsborough Trinity during a six-year spell and was the clubs first team manager between 2016 and 2017.

== Playing career ==
Roma started his professional football career in 2004 with his local side Sheffield United. On 18 May 2007, Roma was released by Sheffield United along with Colin Marrison, Kyle McFadzean, Ryan Gyaki, James Ashmore and Sharu Naraji.

On 18 February 2005, Roma was sent out on a one-month loan to Football League Two side Boston United to gain first team experience, where he made two appearances.

Roma also spent three months on loan in the Football Conference with Staffordshire club Tamworth. During his time with The Lambs, Roma started all 15 games, however was unable to find the back of the net. Following his release from Sheffield United, Roma joined Tamworth for pre season training after recovering from a serious knee injury which he sustained whilst at Sheffield United.

Following the sacking of Steve Housham by Gainsborough Trinity on 10 March 2016, it was announced that Roma would take on the role of interim manager until the end of the season. His first game in charge of Trinity was a 1–0 victory over Nuneaton Town on 12 March.

Following a successful interview, Roma was given the managers job on a permanent basis following Trinity's 4–1 victory over Bradford Park Avenue on the final day of the 2015/16 season.

Roma signed for Scarborough Athletic in February 2017. In summer of 2017 Roma joined Basford United. On 7 March 2019, he was appointed as interim coach. He was later appointed permanently as a part of the backroom staff.

In January 2024, Roma joined North Ferriby. After completing a season and a half with the Villagers, he announced his retirement in April 2026 following the club's last game of the Season v Redcar Athletic.
