= 2009–10 Sheffield United F.C. season =

Sheffield United
2009–10 season
- Chairman: Kevin McCabe
- Manager: Kevin Blackwell
- Stadium: Bramall Lane
- Football League Championship: 8th
- FA Cup: Fourth round
- League Cup: First round
- Top goalscorer: League: Cresswell (12); All: Cresswell (14)
- Highest home attendance: 29,210 (vs. Sheffield Wednesday)
- Lowest home attendance: 7,627 (vs. Port Vale)

The 2009–10 season was Sheffield United's third year in the Football League Championship after being relegated from the Premier League in 2007.

== Kit ==
Sheffield United's kit manufacturers became Macron. Their shirt sponsor continues as VisitMalta.com.

== Events ==
- 1 September 2009 – Paddy Kenny is banned for 9 months after failing his drug test.
- 2 October 2009 – Jordan Robertson is sentenced for 32 months after causing death by a car crash, forcing his loan spell at Bury to be cut short.
- 6 November 2009 – Paddy Kenny signs new contract until the summer of 2011.
- 20 November 2009 – Trevor Birch is appointed as Chief Executive.

== League ==
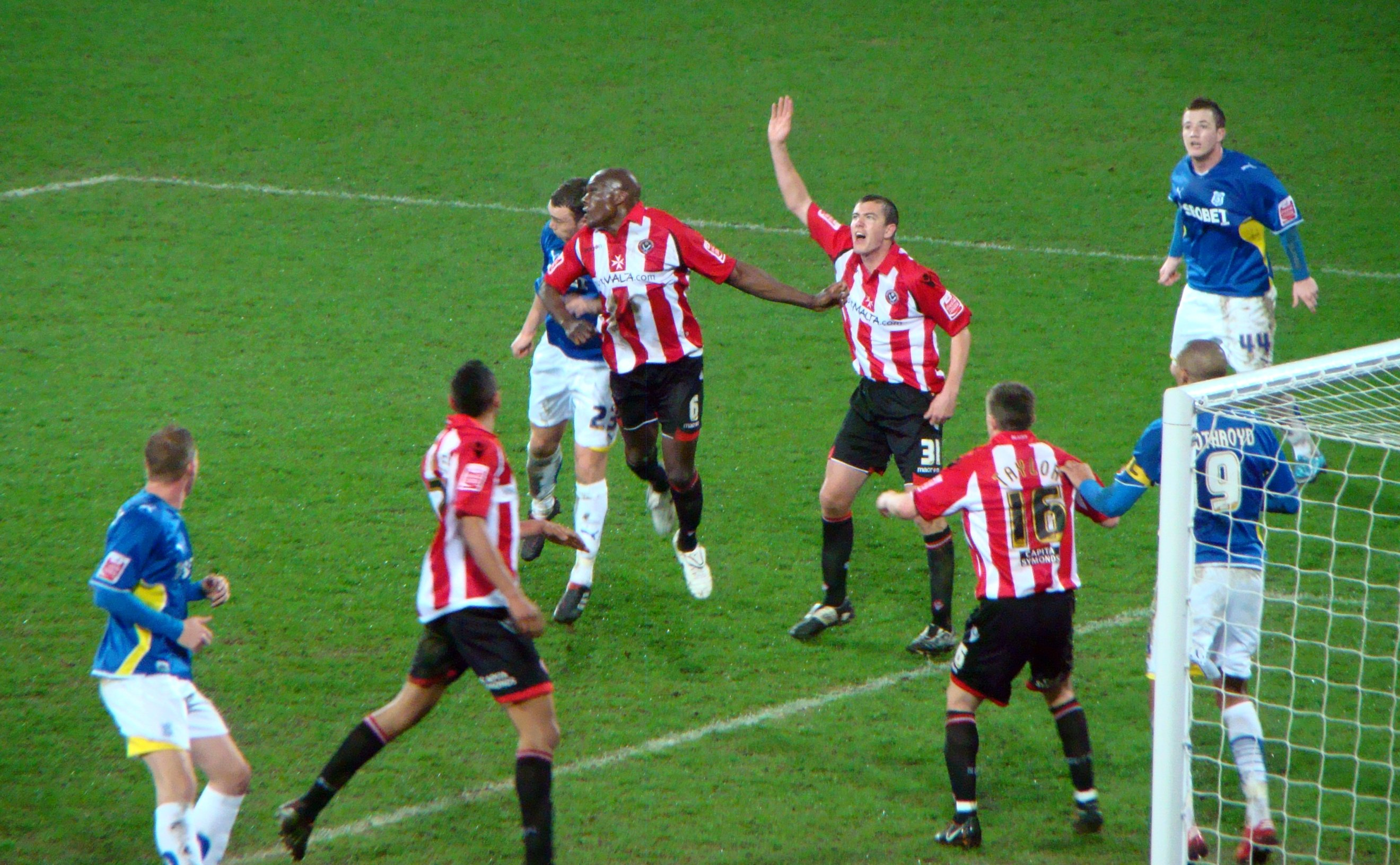
The Blades playing against Cardiff City

Sheffield United played their first game of the season in a 0–0 draw against former Premier League side Middlesbrough. Then the Blades beat Watford 2–0 with Ched Evans getting his debut goal. Leicester City held United to a 1–1 draw. They then beat Reading 3–1. This was followed by a thrilling 2–2 draw against West Bromwich Albion with David Cotterill scoring a late penalty. This was followed by a 1–0 win at Derby County with Matthew Kilgallon getting a last minute winner. United suffered their first league defeat of the season against Coventry City, they bounced back in the Steel City Derby which they won 3–2. The Blades suffered another defeat against Swansea City. The Blades started October with a draw against Doncaster Rovers, with Richard Cresswell getting his first goal for the blades. The next two games saw two losses against Scunthorpe United and Blackpool. The Blades continued their losing streak against Cardiff City. A 1–0 defeat at home to Newcastle United, this was followed with a draw against Barnsley. The following game they beat Peterborough United. United got a late win against Bristol City, with Darius Henderson getting his first hat-trick of his career. James Harper scored the only goal in a win over Plymouth Argyle. The Blades were then held to draw with Nottingham Forest. Sheffield then beat Crystal Palace 2–0, with Lee Williamson getting his first goal in a Blade shirt and Quinn got his second of the season. Queens Park Rangers held the Blades to a 1–1 draw. Sheffield then suffer their first defeat since 2 November against Leicester City this was quickly followed by a win over Preston North End.

Their first game of 2010 saw the Blades beat Middlesbrough 1–0 at Bramall Lane. This was followed up by a 3–0 home win against Reading. The Blades were then beaten 3–1 away at West Bromwich Albion.

== FA Cup ==
In the third round Sheffield United held Championship rivals Queens Park Rangers to a 1–1 draw, resulting in a replay to take place. The Blades won the replay 3–2 at Loftus Road. Premier League Bolton Wanderers knocked out the Blades in the fourth round, beating them 2–0 at the Reebok Stadium.

== League Cup ==
The first round saw a shock 2–1 home defeat against League Two Port Vale.

== Players ==
=== First-team squad ===
Squad at end of season

Note: Flags indicate national team as defined under FIFA eligibility rules; some limited exceptions apply. Players may hold more than one non-FIFA nationality.

No.	Pos.	Nation	Player
1	GK	IRL	Paddy Kenny (Note: Kenny was born in Halifax, England, but also qualified to represent the Republic of Ireland internationally through his parents and made his international debut for the Republic of Ireland in June 2004.)
2	DF	ENG	Ryan France
3	DF	SCO	Gary Naysmith
4	MF	SCO	Nick Montgomery (Note: Montgomery was born in Leeds, England, but also qualified to represent Scotland internationally and represented them at U-21 level.)
5	DF	ENG	Chris Morgan
6	DF	ENG	Nyron Nosworthy (Note: Nosworthy was born in Brixton, England, but also qualified to represent Jamaica internationally through his father and Guyana internationally through his mother, and would make his international debut for Jamaica in May 2012.) (on loan from Sunderland)
7	FW	ENG	Darius Henderson
9	FW	WAL	Ched Evans
11	MF	IRL	Mark Yeates
12	MF	JAM	Lee Williamson (Note: Williamson was born in Derby, England, but also qualified to represent Jamaica internationally and was called up by Jamaica in 2008 before making his international debut in September 2015.)
13	GK	ENG	Ian Bennett
15	MF	ENG	James Harper
16	DF	ENG	Andy Taylor
17	FW	ENG	Richard Cresswell
18	MF	NIR	Jamie Ward (Note: Ward was born in Birmingham, England, but also qualified to represent Northern Ireland internationally through his grandfather and represented them at U-18 and U-21 level before making his international debut for Northern Ireland in August 2011.)

No.	Pos.	Nation	Player
19	DF	ENG	Jordan Stewart
20	DF	NED	Marcel Seip (on loan from Plymouth Argyle)
21	DF	ENG	Kyle Bartley
25	MF	ENG	Glen Little
26	DF	ENG	Derek Geary
28	MF	IRL	Stephen Quinn
30	GK	EST	Mihkel Aksalu
32	DF	FIN	Toni Kallio (on loan from Fulham)
33	DF	ENG	Jonathan Fortune
34	DF	ENG	Matthew Lowton
35	FW	ENG	Nathan Foster
36	DF	ENG	Kingsley James
37	FW	SEN	Henri Camara
40	DF	ENG	Phil Roe

=== Out on loan ===
Note: Flags indicate national team as defined under FIFA eligibility rules; some limited exceptions apply. Players may hold more than one non-FIFA nationality.

No. / Pos. / Nation / Player; 10 / MF / ENG / Kyel Reid (on loan to Charlton Athletic)	No. / Pos. / Nation / Player; 24 / FW / ENG / Billy Sharp (on loan to Doncaster Rovers)

=== Left club during season ===
Note: Flags indicate national team as defined under FIFA eligibility rules; some limited exceptions apply. Players may hold more than one non-FIFA nationality.

No.	Pos.	Nation	Player
6	DF	ENG	Matthew Kilgallon (to Sunderland)
11	MF	WAL	David Cotterill (to Swansea City)
14	DF	AUS	David Carney (to FC Twente)
17	MF	ENG	Lee Hendrie (to Derby County)
20	MF	ENG	Brian Howard (to Reading)
21	DF	ENG	Leigh Bromby (to Leeds United)
21	DF	ENG	Andrew Davies (on loan from Stoke City)
22	GK	MLT	Justin Haber (to Ferencváros)

No.	Pos.	Nation	Player
23	GK	ENG	Mark Bunn (on loan from Blackburn Rovers)
23	GK	ENG	Steve Simonsen (on loan from Stoke City)
27	MF	IRL	Keith Treacy (on loan from Blackburn Rovers)
30	GK	NGA	Carl Ikeme (Note: Ikeme was born in Sutton Coldfield, England, but also qualifies to represent Nigeria internationally and was first called up in March 2007 before making his international debut for Nigeria in September 2015.) (on loan from Wolverhampton Wanderers)
31	DF	ENG	Paul Connolly (on loan from Derby County)
34	DF	ENG	Kyle Walker (on loan from Tottenham Hotspur)
39	FW	ENG	Jordan Robertson (released)

== Squad statistics ==
As of end of the season

No.	Pos	Nat	Player	Total		Championship		FA Cup		League Cup	
No.	Pos	Nat	Player	Apps	Goals	Apps	Goals	Apps	Goals	Apps	Goals
1	GK	(Republic of Ireland) IRL	Paddy Kenny	2	0	2	0	0	0	0	0
2	MF	(England) ENG	Ryan France	10	0	3+6	0	0	0	1	0
3	DF	(Scotland) SCO	Gary Naysmith	3	0	2	0	0	0	1	0
4	MF	(Scotland) SCO	Nick Montgomery	43	1	39	1	3	0	1	0
5	DF	(England) ENG	Chris Morgan	40	2	37	2	3	0	0	0
7	FW	(England) ENG	Darius Henderson	35	12	28+4	12	1+1	0	1	0
9	FW	(Wales) WAL	Ched Evans	36	4	21+12	4	2+1	0	0	0
11	MF	(Republic of Ireland) IRL	Mark Yeates	20	2	11+9	2	0	0	0	0
12	MF	(Jamaica) JAM	Lee Williamson	23	4	14+6	3	2+1	1	0	0
13	GK	(England) ENG	Ian Bennett	6	0	4+1	0	0	0	1	0
15	MF	(England) ENG	James Harper	36	4	31+3	4	2	0	0	0
16	DF	(England) ENG	Andy Taylor	30	0	22+4	0	3	0	1	0
17	FW	(England) ENG	Richard Cresswell	34	14	28+3	12	2+1	2	0	0
18	FW	(England) ENG	Jamie Ward	31	8	25+3	7	1+2	1	0	0
19	DF	(England) ENG	Jordan Stewart	23	0	15+8	0	0	0	0	0
20	DF	(Netherlands) NED	Marcel Seip	8	0	5+1	0	1+1	0	0	0
21	DF	(England) ENG	Kyle Bartley	14	0	10+4	0	0	0	0	0
24	FW	(England) ENG	Billy Sharp	1	1	0	0	0	0	1	1
25	MF	(England) ENG	Glen Little	18	0	7+9	0	0+1	0	1	0
26	MF	(Republic of Ireland) IRL	Derek Geary	9	0	5+2	0	2	0	0	0
28	MF	(Republic of Ireland) IRL	Stephen Quinn	48	4	38+6	4	3	0	1	0
30	GK	(Estonia) EST	Mihkel Aksalu	0	0	0	0	0	0	0	0
32	DF	(Finland) FIN	Toni Kallio	8	0	8	0	0	0	0	0
33	DF	(England) ENG	Jonathan Fortune	6	1	3+2	1	1	0	0	0
34	DF	(England) ENG	Matthew Lowton	2	0	1+1	0	0	0	0	0
37	FW	(Senegal) SEN	Henri Camara	25	4	9+14	4	2	0	0	0
39	FW	(England) ENG	Jordan Robertson	1	0	0	0	0	0	1	0
Players who left before the end of the season:
6	DF	(England) ENG	Matthew Kilgallon	23	1	21	1	1	0	1	0
10	MF	(England) ENG	Kyel Reid	8	0	0+7	0	0	0	1	0
11	MF	(Wales) WAL	David Cotterill	14	2	3+11	2	0	0	0	0
20	MF	(England) ENG	Brian Howard	5	0	3+1	0	0	0	1	0
21	DF	(England) ENG	Leigh Bromby	1	0	0	0	0	0	1	0
21	DF	(England) ENG	Andrew Davies	8	0	7+1	0	0	0	0	0
23	GK	(England) ENG	Mark Bunn	35	0	31+1	0	3	0	0	0
23	GK	(England) ENG	Steve Simonsen	7	0	7	0	0	0	0	0
27	MF	(Republic of Ireland) IRL	Keith Treacy	17	1	12+4	1	0	0	1	0
30	GK	(England) ENG	Carl Ikeme	2	0	2	0	0	0	0	0
31	DF	(England) ENG	Paul Connolly	7	0	7	0	0	0	0	0
34	DF	(England) ENG	Kyle Walker	28	0	26	0	2	0	0	0

=== Disciplinary record ===
Number	Pos	Player	Booked	Sent off (straight red)
7	FW	Darius Henderson	8	1
5	DF	Chris Morgan	10	0
17	FW	Richard Cresswell	8	0
4	MF	Nick Montgomery	8	0
28	MF	Stephen Quinn	8	0
12	MF	Lee Williamson	6	0
16	DF	Andy Taylor	6	0
6	DF	Nyron Nosworthy	3	1
9	FW	Ched Evans	4	0
34	DF	Kyle Walker	4	0
11	DF	Paul Connolly	1	1
11	MF	David Cotterill	3	0
20	DF	Marcel Seip	3	0
18	MF	Jamie Ward	3	0
23	GK	Mark Bunn	2	0
15	MF	James Harper	2	0
32	MF	Toni Kallio	2	0
19	DF	Jordan Stewart	2	0
27	MF	Keith Treacy	2	0
11	MF	Mark Yeates	2	0
21	DF	Kyle Bartley	1	0
21	DF	Andrew Davies	1	0
11	MF	Brian Howard	1	0
6	DF	Matthew Kilgallon	1	0
20	MF	Brian Howard	1	0
26	MF	Derek Geary	1	0

== Events ==
=== Summer transfers in ===
Date	Player	Club	Fee
18 June 2009	Lee Williamson	Watford	£500,000
	Kyel Reid	West Ham United	Free
	Andy Taylor	Tranmere Rovers	£400,000
24 July 2009	Leigh Bromby	Watford	Undisclosed
24 July 2009	Ched Evans	Manchester City	£3,000,000
24 July 2009	Ryan France	Hull City	Free
5 August 2009	Glen Little	Portsmouth F.C	Free
	Jordan Stewart	Derby County	Undisclosed
	Jonathan Fortune	Charlton Athletic	Free

=== Summer transfers out ===
- * Indicates the player joined the club after being released.

Date	Player	Club	Fee
	Ben Starosta	Released	–
	Ugo Ehiogu	Retired	–
	Nicky Law	Rotherham United	Free
	Adam Chapham	Oxford United	Nominal
	Jamie Annerson	Rotherham United*	Free
	Keith Quinn	Released	–
22 July 2009	Kyle Walker	Tottenham Hotspur	Undisclosed
22 July 2009	Kyle Naughton	Tottenham Hotspur	Undisclosed
	Sun Jihai	Chengdu Blades*	Free
	Martin Donelly	Crusaders	Free
	Aymen Tahar	Ferencvárosi TC	Free
	Nicky Travis	Central Coast Mariners	Free
	Mamadou Seck	Released	–
	David Carney	FC Twente	£500,000
1 September 2009	Leigh Bromby	Leeds United	£250,000
	Brian Howard	Reading	£500,000
	Danny Webber	Portsmouth*	Free

=== Loans in ===
- ** Indicates that the player returned before the return date.

Player	Club	Arrival date	Return date
Keith Treacy	Blackburn Rovers**	24 July 2009	24 January 2010 (16 Dec 09)
Mark Bunn	Blackburn Rovers	3 August 2009	End of season
Kyle Walker	Tottenham Hotspur**	5 August 2009	End of season (2 February 2010)
James Harper	Reading	1 September 2009	End of season
Andrew Davies	Stoke City**	17 September 2009	17 December 2009 (16 Dec 09)
Richard Cresswell	Stoke City	29 September 2009	29 December 2009
Carl Ikeme	Wolverhampton Wanderers	26 November 2009	26 December 2009
Toni Kallio	Fulham	26 November 2009	23 December 2009
Marcel Seip	Plymouth Argyle	1 January 2009	End of Season

=== Loans out ===
Player	Club	Arrival date	Return date
Jordan Robertson	Bury	14 August 2009	3 January 2010
Billy Sharp	Doncaster Rovers	1 September 2009	End of season
David Cotterill	Swansea City	24 November 2009	4 January 2010

=== January transfers in ===
Date	Player	Club	Fee
	Richard Cresswell	Stoke City	Undisclosed
	Mark Yeates	Middlesbrough	Undisclosed
	James Harper	Reading	Undisclosed

=== January transfers out ===
Date	Player	Club	Fee
	David Cotterill	Swansea City	£600,000
	Matthew Kilgallon	Sunderland	Undisclosed

== Fixtures and results ==
=== Championship ===
7 August 2009 1	Middlesbrough	0–0	Sheffield United	Riverside Stadium
20:00		Report		Attendance: 23,541

15 August 2009 2	Sheffield United	2–0	Watford	Bramall Lane
20:00	Ward 12'; Evans 63'	Report		Attendance: 24,638

18 August 2009 3	Sheffield United	1–1	Leicester	Bramall Lane
19:45	Treacy 66'	Report	Fryatt 52'	Attendance: 26,069

22 August 2009 4	Reading	1–3	Sheffield United	Madejski Stadium
15:00	Mills 13'	Report	Quinn 42'; Ward 62'; Citterill 90'	Attendance: 16,025

29 August 2009 5	Sheffield United	2–2	West Bromwich Albion	Bramall Lane
15:00	Evans 56'; Cotterill 88' (pen.)	Report	Bednar 54', 60'	Attendance: 25,169

12 September 2009 6	Derby County	0–1	Sheffield United	Pride Park Stadium
15:00		Report	Kilgallon 80'	Attendance: 28,441

15 September 2009 7	Coventry City	3–2	Sheffield United	Ricoh Arena
19:45	Best 12'; Morrison 50'; Craine 60'	Report	Ward 31'; Harper 76'	Attendance: 14,426

18 September 2009 8	Sheffield United	3–2	Sheffield Wednesday	Bramall Lane
19:45	Ward 7'; Henderson 15'; Buxton 42' (o.g.)	Report	Tudgay 46'; Esajas 60'	Attendance: 29,210

26 September 2009 9	Swansea City	2–1	Sheffield United	Liberty Stadium
15:00	Trundle 52' (pen.); Butler 82'; López (yellow card) 77' (yellow-red card); Dyer (yellow card) 90' (yellow-red card)	Report	Quinn 73'	Attendance: 14,324

29 September 2009 10	Sheffield United	3–3	Ipswich Town	Bramall Lane
19:45	Henderson 9', 77'; Morgan 90'	Report	Walters 24'; Leadbitter 34'; McAuley 70'	Attendance: 28,366

3 October 2009 11	Sheffield United	1–1	Doncaster Rovers	Bramall Lane
15:00	Cresswell 65'		Hayter 45'	Attendance: 26,211

17 October 2009 12	Scunthorpe United	3–1	Sheffield United	Glanford Park
12:00	McCann 22', 59'; Hayes 53'		Evans 51'	Attendance: 7,599

20 October 2009 13	Blackpool	3–0	Sheffield United	Bloomfield Road
19:45	Seip 60'; Euell 69'; Adam 82'			Attendance: 8,042

24 October 2009 14	Sheffield United	3–4	Cardiff City	Bramall Lane
15:00	Henderson 43', 45'; Harper 90'		Bothroyd 41'; Whittingham 45' (pen.), 60', 85'	Attendance: 25,021

2 November 2009 15	Sheffield United	0–1	Newcastle United	Bramall Lane
19:45			Morgan 41' (o.g.)	Attendance: 26,536

9 November 2009 16	Barnsley	2–2	Sheffield United	Oakwell
19:45	De Silva 53'; Bogdanović 74'		Henderson 61' (pen.), 83' (pen.)	Attendance: 12,988

21 November 2009 17	Sheffield United	1–0	Peterborough United	Bramall Lane
15:00	Camara 42'			Attendance: 25,144

28 November 2009 18	Bristol City	2–3	Sheffield United	Ashton Gate
15:00	Carey 53'; Saborio 90'		Henderson 30', 33', 90'	Attendance: 14,637

5 December 2009 19	Plymouth Argyle	0–1	Sheffield United	Home Park
15:00			Harper 88'	Attendance: 9,231

8 December 2009 20	Sheffield United	0–0	Nottingham Forest	Bramall Lane
19:45				Attendance: 26,490

12 December 2009 21	Sheffield United	2–0	Crystal Palace	Bramall Lane
15:00	Williamson 21'; Quinn 90'			Attendance: 25,510

19 December 2009 22	Queens Park Rangers	1–1	Sheffield United	Loftus Road
15:00	Leigertwood 2'		Cresswell 8'	Attendance: 12,639

26 December 2009 23	Leicester City	2–1	Sheffield United	Walkers Stadium
18:00	Morrison 26'; Fryatt 35' (pen.)		Camara 47'	Attendance: 23,999

28 December 2009 24	Sheffield United	1–0	Preston North End	Bramall Lane
15:00	Ward 86'			Attendance: 25,231

16 January 2010 25	Sheffield United	1–0	Middlesbrough	Bramall Lane
15:00	Cresswell 56'			Attendance: 23,974

26 January 2010 26	Sheffield United	3–0	Reading	Bramall Lane
15:00	Fortune 12'; Cresswell 42'; Morgan 80'			Attendance: 24,009

30 January 2010 27	West Bromwich Albion	3–1	Sheffield United	The Hawthorns
15:00	Dorrans 19' (pen.); Bednář 30'; Thomas 50'		Henderson 49' (pen.)	Attendance: 22,193

2 February 2010 28	Watford	3–0	Sheffield United	Vicarage Road
19:45	Cleverley 39'; Helguson 55'; Cowie 74'			Attendance: 13,076

6 February 2010 29	Sheffield United	1–1	Derby County	Bramall Lane
15:00	Williamson 90'		Savage 17'	Attendance: 25,300

9 February 2010 30	Preston North End	2–1	Sheffield United	Deepdale
19:45	James 17'; Parkin 71'		Yeates 81'	Attendance: 10,270

13 February 2010 31	Sheffield United	2–0	Bristol City	Bramall Lane
15:00	Camara 49'; Henderson 62'			Attendance: 22,613

16 February 2010 32	Nottingham Forest	1–0	Sheffield United	City Ground
19:45	Earnshaw 4'		Henderson (red card) 46'	Attendance: 22,076

27 February 2010 33	Sheffield United	4–3	Plymouth Argyle	Bramall Lane
15:00	Camara 7'; Ward 35', 47'; Cresswell 80'		Bolasie 48'; Mason 56'; Mackie 85'	Attendance: 24,886

6 March 2010 34	Crystal Palace	1–0	Sheffield United	Selhurst Park
15:00	Lee 23'			Attendance: 13,455

9 March 2010 35	Peterborough United	1–0	Sheffield United	London Road
19:30	Mackail-Smith 40'			Attendance: 6,674

13 March 2010 36	Sheffield United	1–1	Queens Park Rangers	Bramall Lane
15:00	Cresswell 44'		Taarabt 49'	Attendance: 23,456

16 March 2010 37	Sheffield United	3–0	Blackpool	Bramall Lane
19:45	Cresswell 1', 66'; Montgomery 43'			Attendance: 22,555

20 March 2010 38	Doncaster Rovers	1–1	Sheffield United	Keepmoat Stadium
15:00	Hayter 5'		Harper 88'	Attendance: 13,026

24 March 2010 39	Cardiff City	1–1	Sheffield United	Cardiff City Stadium
19:45	Bothroyd 45'		Quinn 67'	Attendance: 18,715

28 March 2010 40	Sheffield United	0–1	Scunthorpe United	Bramall Lane
12:15			Hayes 45'	Attendance: 23,005

3 April 2010 41	Sheffield United	0–0	Barnsley	Bramall Lane
15:00	Connolly (yellow card) 90' (yellow-red card)			Attendance: 24,808

5 April 2010 42	Newcastle United	2–1	Sheffield United	St James' Park
19:45	Løvenkrands 45' (pen.); Nolan 73'		Cresswell 22'	Attendance: 48,270

10 April 2010 43	Sheffield United	1–0	Coventry City	Bramall Lane
15:00	Cresswell 47'			Attendance: 23,603

18 April 2010 44	Sheffield Wednesday	1–1	Sheffield United	Hillsborough
13:00	Potter 41'		Williamson 60'	Attendance: 35,485

24 April 2010 45	Sheffield United	2–0	Swansea City	Bramall Lane
15:00	Cresswell 62' de Vries 90' (o.g.)			Attendance: 25,966

2 May 2010 46	Ipswich Town	0–3	Sheffield United	Portman Road
13:00	Eastman (yellow card) 58' (yellow-red card)		Yeates 34'; Evans 56'; Cresswell 66'	Attendance: 23,003

=== FA Cup ===
3 January 2010 Third round	Sheffield United	1–1	Queens Park Rangers	Bramall Lane
15:00	Cresswell 45'		Simpson 39'	Attendance: 11,461

12 January 2010 Third round replay	Queens Park Rangers	2–3	Sheffield United	Loftus Road
19:45	Buzsaky 71' (pen.); Stewart 88'		Williamson 19'; Ward 68'; Cresswell 70'	Attendance: 5,780

23 January 2010 Fourth round	Bolton Wanderers	2–0	Sheffield United	Reebok Stadium
15:00	Steinsson 48'; Elmander 84'			Attendance: 14,572

=== League Cup ===
11 August 2009 First round	Sheffield United	1–2	Port Vale	Bramall Lane
19:45	Sharp 33'		Richards 20', 61'	Attendance: 7,627

== Summer friendlies and Malta tour ==
Sheffield United are due to play three friendly matches in July all away as well as tour of Malta. The Friendlies are:

- 10 July 2010: Mansfield Town F.C.
- 12–17 July: Malta Tour
- 20 July 2010: Burton Albion F.C.
- 24 July 2010: Rotherham United F.C.
