= 2007–08 Sheffield United F.C. season =

Sheffield United
2007–08 season
- Chairman: Terry Robinson
- Manager: Bryan Robson (until 14 February); Kevin Blackwell (from 14 February)
- Stadium: Bramall Lane
- Championship: 9th
- FA Cup: Fifth round
- League Cup: Fourth round
- Top goalscorer: Beattie (22)
- Average home league attendance: 25,605

Sheffield United competed in the Football League Championship during the 2007–08 football season, after being relegated from the Premier League during 2006–07.

== Season summary ==
Manager Bryan Robson was dismissed in February with Sheffield United nowhere near a position good enough for an immediate return to the Premier League. His replacement, Kevin Blackwell, improved United's form sufficiently that they were still mathematically in with a shout of a play-off place until the last day of the season, but a shock loss to relegation-threatened Southampton ended any such hopes (though results elsewhere meant that the Blades wouldn't have made the play-offs even had they won), and United finished in a relatively disappointing 9th position.

== Kit ==
Sheffield United maintained both their kit manufacturing agreement with French company Le Coq Sportif, who produced a new home kit for the season, and their kit sponsorship agreement with American bank Capital One. A new away strip with fluorescent green shirts and black shirts and socks with fluorescent green trim was also introduced.

== Final league table ==
Pos	Team	Pld	W	D	L	GF	GA	GD	Pts
7	Wolverhampton Wanderers	46	18	16	12	53	48	+5	70
8	Ipswich Town	46	18	15	13	65	56	+9	69
9	Sheffield United	46	17	15	14	56	51	+5	66
10	Plymouth Argyle	46	17	13	16	60	50	+10	64
11	Charlton Athletic	46	17	13	16	63	58	+5	64

Updated to match(es) played on 4 May 2008. Source: The Football League
Rules for classification: 1) points; 2) goal difference; 3) number of goals scored.

== Results ==
Sheffield United's score comes first

=== Legend ===
Win	Draw	Loss

=== Football League Championship ===
Date	Opponent	Venue	Result	Attendance	Scorers
11 August 2007	Colchester United	H	2–2	26,202	Beattie, Tonge
18 August 2007	Watford	A	0–1	16,414	
25 August 2007	West Bromwich Albion	H	1–0	23,491	Beattie
1 September 2007	Scunthorpe United	A	2–3	8,801	Webber (2)
15 September 2007	Wolverhampton Wanderers	H	3–1	26,003	Beattie (2, 1 pen), Stead
18 September 2007	Blackpool	A	2–2	9,512	Beattie (2)
22 September 2007	Crystal Palace	A	2–3	14,131	Hudson (own goal), Beattie
29 September 2007	Southampton	H	1–2	24,561	Gillespie
2 October 2007	Cardiff City	H	3–3	26,186	Beattie, Armstrong, Morgan
6 October 2007	Bristol City	A	0–2	13,071	
20 October 2007	Preston North End	H	1–1	23,661	Beattie (pen)
23 October 2007	Leicester City	A	1–0	21,146	Webber
27 October 2007	Hull City	A	1–1	20,185	Stead
3 November 2007	Burnley	H	0–0	25,306	
6 November 2007	Ipswich Town	H	3–1	25,033	Beattie (2, 1 pen), Gillespie
10 November 2007	Stoke City	A	1–0	12,158	Cahill
24 November 2007	Plymouth Argyle	H	0–1	23,811	
27 November 2007	Charlton Athletic	A	3–0	20,737	Beattie, Cahill, Armstrong
1 December 2007	Coventry City	A	1–0	20,355	Armstrong
4 December 2007	Stoke City	H	0–3	23,378	
8 December 2007	Norwich City	A	0–1	24,493	
15 December 2007	Barnsley	H	1–0	26,629	Kilgallon
22 December 2007	Cardiff City	A	0–1	12,869	
26 December 2007	Blackpool	H	1–1	26,409	Beattie
29 December 2007	Crystal Palace	H	0–1	23,982	
1 January 2008	Wolverhampton Wanderers	A	0–0	24,791	
12 January 2008	Queens Park Rangers	H	2–1	28,894	Stewart (own goal), Hendrie
19 January 2008	Sheffield Wednesday	A	0–2	30,486	
29 January 2008	Watford	H	1–1	23,161	Carney
2 February 2008	Colchester United	A	2–2	5,695	Shelton, Carney
9 February 2008	Scunthorpe United	H	0–0	25,668	
12 February 2008	West Bromwich Albion	A	0–0	22,643	
23 February 2008	Queens Park Rangers	A	1–1	15,383	Morgan
1 March 2008	Charlton Athletic	H	0–2	23,180	
4 March 2008	Ipswich Town	A	1–1	20,190	Beattie
8 March 2008	Plymouth Argyle	A	1–0	13,669	Beattie
11 March 2008	Coventry City	H	2–1	23,864	Sharp, Speed
15 March 2008	Norwich City	H	2–0	25,536	Sharp, Kilgallon
22 March 2008	Barnsley	A	1–0	15,798	Sharp
29 March 2008	Preston North End	A	1–3	14,647	Beattie (pen)
5 April 2008	Leicester City	H	3–0	24,818	Beattie (3)
8 April 2008	Sheffield Wednesday	H	2–2	31,760	Wood (own goal), Beattie
12 April 2008	Burnley	A	2–1	11,693	Beattie, Sharp
19 April 2008	Hull City	H	2–0	28,188	Quinn, Beattie (pen)
26 April 2008	Bristol City	H	2–1	29,787	Speed (2, 1 pen)
4 May 2008	Southampton	A	2–3	31,957	Quinn, Stead

=== FA Cup ===
Round	Date	Opponent	Venue	Result	Attendance	Goalscorers
R3	5 January 2008	Bolton Wanderers	A	1–0	15,286	Carney
R4	27 January 2008	Manchester City	H	2–1	20,800	Shelton, Stead
R5	17 February 2008	Middlesbrough	H	0–0	22,210	
R5R	27 February 2008	Middlesbrough	A	0–1	28,108	

=== League Cup ===
Round	Date	Opponent	Venue	Result	Attendance	Goalscorers
R1	14 August 2007	Chesterfield	H	3–1	11,170	Stead (2), Webber
R2	28 August 2007	Milton Keynes Dons	A	3–2 (a.e.t.)	7,943	Lucketti, Law, Horsfield
R3	25 September 2007	Morecambe	H	5–0	8,854	Sharp (2), Shelton (2), Hendrie
R4	31 October 2007	Arsenal	H	0–3	16,971	

== Players ==
=== First-team squad ===
Squad at end of season

Note: Flags indicate national team as defined under FIFA eligibility rules; some limited exceptions apply. Players may hold more than one non-FIFA nationality.

No.	Pos.	Nation	Player
1	GK	IRL	Paddy Kenny (Note: Kenny was born in Halifax, England, but also qualified to represent the Republic of Ireland internationally through his parents and made his international debut for the Republic of Ireland in June 2004.)
3	DF	SCO	Gary Naysmith
5	DF	ENG	Chris Morgan
6	FW	ENG	James Beattie
7	FW	JAM	Luton Shelton
8	FW	ENG	Jon Stead
9	FW	ENG	Rob Hulse
10	FW	ENG	Danny Webber
11	MF	ENG	Lee Hendrie
12	FW	WAL	David Cotterill (on loan from Wigan Athletic)
13	GK	ENG	Ian Bennett
14	DF	AUS	David Carney
15	MF	WAL	Gary Speed
16	DF	ENG	Matthew Kilgallon
17	MF	SCO	Nick Montgomery (Note: Montgomery was born in Leeds, England, but also qualified to represent Scotland internationally and represented them at U-21 level.)

No.	Pos.	Nation	Player
18	MF	ENG	Michael Tonge
19	MF	NIR	Keith Gillespie
20	DF	ENG	Chris Armstrong (Note: Armstrong was born in Newcastle upon Tyne, England, and represented England at U-20 level, but also qualified to represent Scotland internationally through his grandmother and represented them at B level.)
21	DF	ENG	John Halls (on loan from Reading)
22	DF	ENG	Chris Lucketti
23	MF	ENG	Lee Martin (on loan from Manchester United)
24	FW	ENG	Billy Sharp
25	GK	ENG	Paul Gerrard
26	DF	ENG	Derek Geary
28	MF	IRL	Stephen Quinn
29	FW	ENG	Geoff Horsfield
31	MF	ENG	Nicky Law
33	DF	ENG	Ugo Ehiogu
35	MF	ENG	James Ashmore
—	FW	MKD	Goran Slavkovski (Note: Slavkovski was born in Malmö, Sweden, and represented Sweden at every level between U-15 and U-19, but also qualified to represent Macedonia (now North Macedonia) internationally and would later represent them at U-21 level.) (on loan from Inter Milan)

=== Left club during season ===
Note: Flags indicate national team as defined under FIFA eligibility rules; some limited exceptions apply. Players may hold more than one non-FIFA nationality.

No.	Pos.	Nation	Player
2	DF	ENG	Leigh Bromby (to Watford)
4	DF	ENG	Phil Bardsley (Note: Bardsley was born in Salford, England, but also qualified to represent Scotland internationally through his father and would make his international debut for Scotland in October 2010.) (on loan from Manchester United)
12	MF	IRL	Alan Quinn (to Ipswich Town)
21	MF	ENG	Mikele Leigertwood (Note: Leigertwood was born in Enfield, England, but also qualified to represent Antigua and Barbuda internationally and would make his international debut for Antigua and Barbuda in November 2008.) (to Queens Park Rangers)
21	DF	ENG	Gary Cahill (on loan from Aston Villa)
23	MF	EGY	Ahmed Fathy (to Al Ahly)

No.	Pos.	Nation	Player
27	FW	FRA	Christian Nadé (to Hearts)
30	MF	CHN	Li Tie (to Chengdu Blades)
32	DF	ENG	Evan Horwood (to Carlisle United)
36	MF	ENG	Ian Ross (to Rotherham United)
40	GK	ENG	Jamie Annerson (released)

== Statistics ==
=== Appearances and goals ===
No.	Pos	Nat	Player	Total		Championship		FA Cup		League Cup	
No.	Pos	Nat	Player	Apps	Goals	Apps	Goals	Apps	Goals	Apps	Goals
Goalkeepers
1	GK	(Republic of Ireland) IRL	Paddy Kenny	47	0	40	0	4	0	3	0
13	GK	(England) ENG	Ian Bennett	8	0	6+1	0	0	0	1	0
Defenders
3	DF	(Scotland) SCO	Gary Naysmith	43	0	38	0	3	0	2	0
5	DF	(England) ENG	Chris Morgan	30	2	25	2	3	0	2	0
14	DF	(Australia) AUS	David Carney	26	3	18+3	2	1+1	1	3	0
16	DF	(England) ENG	Matthew Kilgallon	46	2	39+1	2	3	0	3	0
20	DF	(England) ENG	Chris Armstrong	37	3	27+5	3	1+1	0	2+1	0
21	DF	(England) ENG	John Halls	6	0	5+1	0	0	0	0	0
22	DF	(England) ENG	Chris Lucketti	9	1	4+2	0	0	0	3	1
26	DF	(Republic of Ireland) IRL	Derek Geary	28	0	19+2	0	4	0	3	0
33	DF	(England) ENG	Ugo Ehiogu	10	0	5+5	0	0	0	0	0
Midfielders
11	MF	(England) ENG	Lee Hendrie	14	2	7+5	1	1	0	1	1
12	MF	(Wales) WAL	David Cotterill	16	0	15+1	0	0	0	0	0
15	MF	(Wales) WAL	Gary Speed	22	3	20	3	2	0	0	0
17	MF	(Scotland) SCO	Nick Montgomery	23	0	18+2	0	1	0	2	0
18	MF	(England) ENG	Michael Tonge	52	1	37+8	1	2+1	0	2+2	0
19	MF	(Northern Ireland) NIR	Keith Gillespie	38	2	23+12	2	1+1	0	0+1	0
23	MF	(England) ENG	Lee Martin	9	0	5+1	0	2+1	0	0	0
28	MF	(Republic of Ireland) IRL	Stephen Quinn	25	2	15+4	2	4	0	2	0
31	MF	(England) ENG	Nicky Law	3	0	0+1	0	0	0	1+1	0
Forwards
6	FW	(England) ENG	James Beattie	41	22	36+3	22	2	0	0	0
7	FW	(Jamaica) JAM	Luton Shelton	21	4	5+10	1	2+1	1	1+2	2
8	FW	(England) ENG	Jon Stead	31	6	12+12	3	4	1	3	2
9	FW	(England) ENG	Rob Hulse	24	0	10+11	0	0+3	0	0	0
10	FW	(England) ENG	Danny Webber	17	4	8+6	3	1	0	1+1	1
24	FW	(England) ENG	Billy Sharp	36	6	21+8	4	2+2	0	3	2
Players left during the season
2	DF	(England) ENG	Leigh Bromby	16	0	11	0	2	0	2+1	0
4	DF	(Scotland) SCO	Phil Bardsley	16	0	16	0	0	0	0	0
12	MF	(Republic of Ireland) IRL	Alan Quinn	12	0	4+4	0	0	0	2+2	0
21	MF	(Antigua and Barbuda) ANT	Mikele Leigertwood	4	0	1+1	0	0	0	2	0
21	DF	(England) ENG	Gary Cahill	16	2	16	2	0	0	0	0
29	FW	(England) ENG	Geoff Horsfield	2	1	0	0	0	0	0+2	1

== Summer Transfers ==
=== In ===
Date	Position	Name	Club From	Fee	Reference
4 July 2007	FW	Billy Sharp	Scunthorpe United	Undisclosed	
5 July 2007	DF	Gary Naysmith	Everton	£1,000,000	
19 July 2007	MF	Lee Hendrie	Aston Villa	Free	
4 August 2007	FW	James Beattie	Everton	£4,000,000	
4 August 2007	MF	David Carney	Sydney FC	£50,000	
19 September 2007	DF	Gary Cahill	Aston Villa	Loan	

=== Out ===
Date	Position	Name	Club To	Fee	Reference
15 June 2007	FW	Colin Kazim-Richards	Fenerbahçe SK	£1,275,000	
1 July 2007	DF	Craig Short	Free Agency	Released	
1 July 2007	DF	Alan Wright	Free Agency	Released	
3 July 2007	DF	Rob Kozluk	Barnsley	Free Transfer	
4 July 2007	FW	Jonathan Forte	Scunthorpe United	Swap Deal	
4 July 2007	DF	Phil Jagielka	Everton	£4,000,000	
6 July 2007	DF	Claude Davis	Derby County	£3,000,000	
19 July 2007	DF	David Sommeil	Valenciennes	Undisclosed	
31 August 2007	MF	Mikele Leigertwood	QPR	£900,000	
31 August 2007	FW	Christian Nadé	Hearts	Undisclosed	
11 September 2007	MF	Ahmed Fathy	Al Ahly	Undisclosed	

== Winter Transfers ==
=== In ===
Date	Position	Name	Club From	Fee	Reference
1 January 2008	MF	Gary Speed	Bolton Wanderers	£250,000	
10 January 2008	MF	Lee Martin	Manchester United	Loan until May	
18 January 2008	DF	Ugo Ehiogu	Rangers	Free transfer	
31 January 2008	FW	Goran Slavkovski	Inter Milan	Loan until May	
8 February 2008	FW	David Cotterill	Wigan Athletic	Loan until May	

=== Out ===
Date	Position	Name	Club To	Fee	Reference
2 January 2008	DF	Mamadou Seck	Scunthorpe United	Loan	
24 January 2008	MF	Alan Quinn	Ipswich Town	Undisclosed	
25 January 2008	GK	Paul Gerrard	Blackpool	Loan until May	
31 January 2008	DF	Leigh Bromby	Watford	£600,000	
	MF	Li Tie	Chengdu Blades	Free	
31 January 2008	FW	Geoff Horsfield	Scunthorpe United	Loan until May	
