= Jon Stead =

English footballer (born 1983)

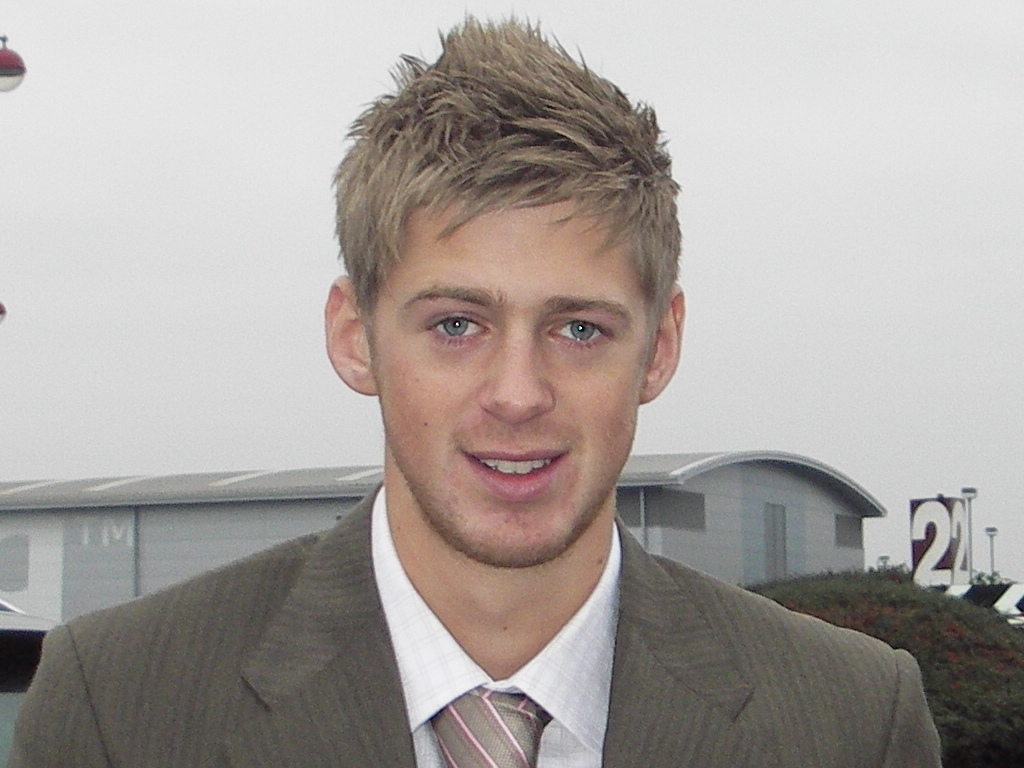
- Stead with Derby County in 2006

Personal information
- Full name: Jonathan Graeme Stead
- Date of birth: 7 April 1983 (age 43)
- Place of birth: Huddersfield, England
- Height: 6 ft 3 in (1.91 m)
- Position: Striker

Team information
- Current team: Huddersfield Town (first-team coach)

Youth career
- Huddersfield Town

Senior career*
Years	Team	Apps	(Gls)
2002–2004	Huddersfield Town	68	(22)
2004–2005	Blackburn Rovers	42	(8)
2005–2007	Sunderland	35	(2)
2006–2007	→ Derby County (loan)	17	(3)
2007–2008	Sheffield United	39	(8)
2008	→ Ipswich Town (loan)	1	(1)
2008–2010	Ipswich Town	63	(18)
2010	→ Coventry City (loan)	10	(2)
2010–2013	Bristol City	79	(20)
2013–2015	Huddersfield Town	19	(2)
2014	→ Oldham Athletic (loan)	5	(0)
2014	→ Bradford City (loan)	8	(1)
2014–2015	→ Bradford City (loan)	32	(6)
2015–2019	Notts County	162	(42)
2019–2021	Harrogate Town	46	(8)
Total		626	(143)

International career
2004–2005	England U21	11	(1)

Managerial career
- 2026-: Huddersfield Town (interim head coach)
- * Club domestic league appearances and goals

Jonathan Graeme Stead (born 7 April 1983) is an English football coach and former professional player. He is currently first-team coach at Huddersfield Town.

As a player he was a striker who played for Huddersfield Town, Blackburn Rovers, Sunderland, Derby County, Sheffield United, Ipswich Town, Coventry City, Bristol City, Oldham Athletic, Bradford City, Notts County and Harrogate Town, and was also an England under-21 international, earning 11 caps and scoring once.

== Club career ==
=== Huddersfield Town ===
Stead began his career with home town club Huddersfield Town where he came through the club's academy. He made his league debut for Huddersfield Town, as a nineteen-year-old against Brentford on 10 August 2002 coming as a 69th-minute substitute in the 2–0 loss on the opening day of the season. In total Stead made 42 league appearances scoring six goals in the 2002–03 season.

He scored four goals in three games at the start of the 2003–04 season, igniting interest from larger clubs. Two goals came in Town's opening game of the 2003–04 season in their 2–2 draw at home to Cambridge United. Stead went on to score two goals in a game on three further occasions for the Terriers during the first part of the 2003–04 season, with his other braces coming against Northampton Town on 13 September in a 3–0 home win, in a dramatic 3–3 away draw at Mansfield Town on 22 November and then again in a 3–1 home win over Doncaster Rovers on 3 January 2004.

He scored 18 goals for Huddersfield in 2003–04, with 16 of them coming in the league, before moving to Premier League side Blackburn Rovers in the January transfer window. His last game for Huddersfield came in their 2–0 win over Boston United on 17 January 2004.

Stead returned to collect his Play-offs Winners' Medal with Huddersfield Town while he was playing for Blackburn Rovers. He appeared on the pitch celebrating the team he supported as a boy and his hometown club's win. After this he said, "I've moved on, but I know I won't find a friendlier place than this club".

=== Blackburn Rovers ===
In February 2004 he moved to Blackburn Rovers for over £1 million and signed a four-and-a-half-year contract. Stead marked his debut by scoring the only goal in a match against Middlesbrough. He went on to score six goals, including vital winners against Fulham, Manchester United and Everton as Blackburn avoided relegation from the Premiership.

However, the goals for Blackburn dried up the following season and with manager Mark Hughes signing additional forwards including Welsh international Craig Bellamy, Stead was transferred on 13 June 2005 to Sunderland in a deal worth £1.8 million.

=== Sunderland ===
During his time at Sunderland Stead scored two goals, the first of which was on 1 April 2006 against Everton at Goodison Park in a 2–2 draw, breaking his duck of 11 months without a goal. He scored his second Sunderland goal in the 3–1 defeat to Southend United at Roots Hall on 19 August 2006.

On 13 October 2006, he completed a loan move to Derby County and after failing to find the back of the net in his first 6 games, he finally broke his Derby duck with the first goal in a 2–1 win away at Coventry City on 11 November. He followed that goal with the opener in a 2–0 win at Luton Town to make it two in eight appearances and then again went on to bag Derby's first in the 1–0 home win against Leicester City. He was nominated for Powerade Player of the Month as a result of his form at Derby in November.

=== Sheffield United ===
Stead was signed by Sheffield United from Sunderland for a fee of £750,000, potentially rising to £1.2 million, on a three-and-a-half-year deal on 11 January 2007.

On 13 January 2007, Stead played his first Premier League game with Sheffield United against Portsmouth and scored his first goal for the Blades a few weeks later, in his third game, against Fulham. He would go on to score again for the Blades in the next match against his former club Blackburn Rovers where Stead's muted celebration further endeared him to the Rovers fans, who remained grateful for the considerable contribution he had made during the relegation scrap in 2004.

He scored a respectable five goals in total that season, the final of which came on the last day of the season against Wigan Athletic on 12 May, but his goal wasn't enough to prevent United from being relegated.

Stead found first team starts harder to come by the following season as he fell behind James Beattie and Billy Sharp in the pecking order but still managed to make over thirty appearances and score six goals. During the subsequent transfer window Stead signed on loan for Championship rivals Ipswich Town with a view to a permanent move.

=== Ipswich Town ===
Stead made his move to Ipswich permanent on 15 September 2008 after playing just one game on loan for a fee believed to be around £600,000. In that loan game he scored a 20-yard goal, which he described as "the best goal of his career to date". On 25 April 2009, Stead was the last ever senior player to score at Ninian Park after a 3–0 win.

On 15 February 2010, Stead joined Coventry City on loan until the end of the season with a view to a permanent move. He made 10 appearances for the Sky Blues scoring twice before returning to Ipswich at the end of the season. He has scored in every year of his career to date, notching at least 2 goals for each of the clubs he has played for.

Stead was linked with a move to Blackpool in 2010.

=== Bristol City ===
Stead joined Bristol City on a three-year contract on 22 August 2010. He made his debut in the 2–0 loss at previous club Ipswich Town. Stead scored his first goal for Bristol City when he netted in a 3–1 defeat against Portsmouth on 28 September 2010.

On 8 May 2013, Stead was released by City, in hopes of making a move up north to involve his kids spending time with their grandparents.

=== Return to Huddersfield Town ===
On 24 June 2013, Stead agreed a return to home town club Huddersfield Town on a two-year deal becoming the team's first signing ahead of the 2013–14 season. He made his 2nd début for the club as a substitute in the 2–1 win over Bradford City in the Football League Cup on 6 August, followed by his league début on 24 August in the 5–1 win over AFC Bournemouth. He scored his first goal for the club in the 3–2 win over local rivals Leeds United on 26 October 2013.

==== Oldham Athletic (loan) ====
On 31 January 2014, Stead joined Oldham Athletic on an initial one-month loan.

==== Bradford City (loan) ====
On 27 March 2014, Stead joined League One side Bradford City on loan until the end of the 2013–14 season. He made his debut two days later in a 1–0 win away to Leyton Orient. Although he returned to Huddersfield at the end of the season, he rejoined Bradford City on loan on 17 October 2014. He scored four goals in fifteen games in his second loan spell, and briefly returned to Huddersfield in January before Bradford took him on loan for the rest of the 2014–15 season on 8 January. On 24 January 2015 Stead scored one goal and set up a further two in a much deserved 4–2 win away at Chelsea in the FA Cup. In the next round of the FA Cup, Stead scored again; this time in a 2–0 win over his old club Sunderland.

=== Notts County ===
On 2 July 2015 Stead signed for Notts County. He signed a new contract with Notts County at the end of the 2017–18 season.

He was released by Notts County at the end of the 2018–19 season.

=== Harrogate Town ===
On 11 June 2019, Stead joined Harrogate Town of the National League. He made his debut for Harrogate in a 2–2 draw with Solihull Moors on 3 August. On 7 September, Stead scored a brace in a 2–4 defeat to Torquay United, in a match in which he was later sent-off. He helped Harrogate win promotion from the National League through the play-offs during his first season at the club, beating his former club Notts County in the final.

On 8 May 2021 – after the final game of the 2020–21 League Two season – Stead announced, on his Twitter account, that he was retiring from professional football having made a total of 704 first-team appearances scoring 165 goals.

== Coaching career ==
Stead joined Harry Watling's staff at Hartford Athletic in the USL Championship as an assistant coach in June 2021.

In January 2022, Stead moved to an assistant coaching role with the Tampa Bay Rowdies. In Florida, he reunited with former Sunderland teammate and current Rowdies manager Neill Collins.

In July 2023, it was announced that Stead would be moving to Barnsley along with Collins. He departed the club at the end of the 2024–25 season.

In June 2025, Stead joined League Two side Bristol Rovers as an assistant head coach. The appointment saw him reunite with manager Darrell Clarke whom he had assisted at Barnsley the previous season. On 13 December 2025, following a club-record ten consecutive league defeats, Clarke and Stead were relieved from their duties.

In January 2026, Stead returned to hometown club Huddersfield Town as a first-team coach to the recently appointed Liam Manning.

== International career ==
Stead has represented England at international level, as his early goalscoring exploits at Blackburn Rovers led to a call-up for the England Under-21 side for their game against the Netherlands in February 2004. However, he managed just 1 goal in 11 appearances for the Under-21s between 2004 and 2005.

== Personal life ==
Born in Huddersfield, Stead was raised in Honley and attended Honley High School. Stead and his wife Elizabeth have two daughters.

== Career statistics ==
As of match played 8 May 2021

Appearances and goals by club, season and competition
Club	Season	League			FA Cup		League Cup		Other		Total	
Club	Season	Division	Apps	Goals	Apps	Goals	Apps	Goals	Apps	Goals	Apps	Goals
Huddersfield Town	2002–03	Second Division	42	6	1	0	2	0	1 (Note: Appearance(s) in Football League Trophy)	0	46	6
Huddersfield Town	2003–04	Third Division	26	16	1	0	3	2	1	0	31	18
Huddersfield Town	Total		68	22	2	0	5	2	2	0	77	24
Blackburn Rovers	2003–04	Premier League	13	6	0	0	0	0	0	0	13	6
Blackburn Rovers	2004–05	Premier League	29	2	4	0	1	0	0	0	34	2
Blackburn Rovers	Total		42	8	4	0	1	0	0	0	47	8
Sunderland	2005–06	Premier League	30	1	2	0	2	0	0	0	34	1
Sunderland	2006–07	Championship	5	1	0	0	1	0	0	0	6	1
Sunderland	Total		35	2	2	0	3	0	0	0	40	2
Derby County (loan)	2006–07	Championship	17	3	0	0	0	0	0	0	17	3
Sheffield United	2006–07	Premier League	14	5	0	0	0	0	0	0	14	5
Sheffield United	2007–08	Championship	24	3	4	1	3	2	0	0	31	6
Sheffield United	2008–09	Championship	1	0	0	0	1	0	0	0	2	0
Sheffield United	Total		39	8	4	1	4	2	0	0	47	11
Ipswich Town	2008–09	Championship	39	12	2	1	0	0	0	0	41	13
Ipswich Town	2009–10	Championship	22	6	0	0	0	0	0	0	22	6
Ipswich Town	2010–11	Championship	3	1	0	0	1	0	0	0	4	1
Ipswich Town	Total		64	19	2	1	1	0	0	0	67	20
Coventry City (loan)	2009–10	Championship	10	2	0	0	0	0	0	0	10	2
Bristol City	2010–11	Championship	27	9	1	0	0	0	0	0	28	9
Bristol City	2011–12	Championship	24	6	0	0	1	0	0	0	25	6
Bristol City	2012–13	Championship	28	5	1	0	1	0	0	0	30	5
Bristol City	Total		79	20	2	0	2	0	0	0	83	20
Huddersfield Town	2013–14	Championship	19	2	0	0	4	1	0	0	23	3
Oldham Athletic (loan)	2013–14	League One	5	0	0	0	0	0	0	0	5	0
Bradford City (loan)	2013–14	League One	8	1	0	0	0	0	0	0	8	1
Bradford City (loan)	2014–15	League One	32	6	8	5	0	0	0	0	40	11
Bradford City (loan)	Total		40	7	8	5	0	0	0	0	48	12
Notts County	2015–16	League Two	43	11	1	0	2	1	2	2	48	14
Notts County	2016–17	League Two	38	14	2	0	1	0	0	0	41	14
Notts County	2017–18	League Two	43	9	5	4	1	0	3 (Note: One appearance in EFL Trophy, two in League Two play-offs)	0	52	13
Notts County	2018–19	League Two	38	8	0	0	1	2	2 (Note: Appearances in EFL Trophy)	0	41	10
Notts County	Total		162	42	8	4	5	3	7	2	182	51
Harrogate Town	2019–20	National League	27	7	1	0	–		6 (Note: Two appearances in National League play-offs, four in FA Trophy)	0	34	7
Harrogate Town	2020–21	League Two	19	1	0	0	2	0	3	1	24	2
Harrogate Town	Total		46	8	1	0	2	0	9	1	58	9
Career total			626	143	33	11	27	8	18	3	704	165

== Honours ==
Harrogate Town

- National League play-offs: 2020
- FA Trophy: 2019–20

Individual

- Bristol City Player of the Year: 2011–12
- EFL League Two Player of the Month: September 2016
