= Danny Webber =

English footballer

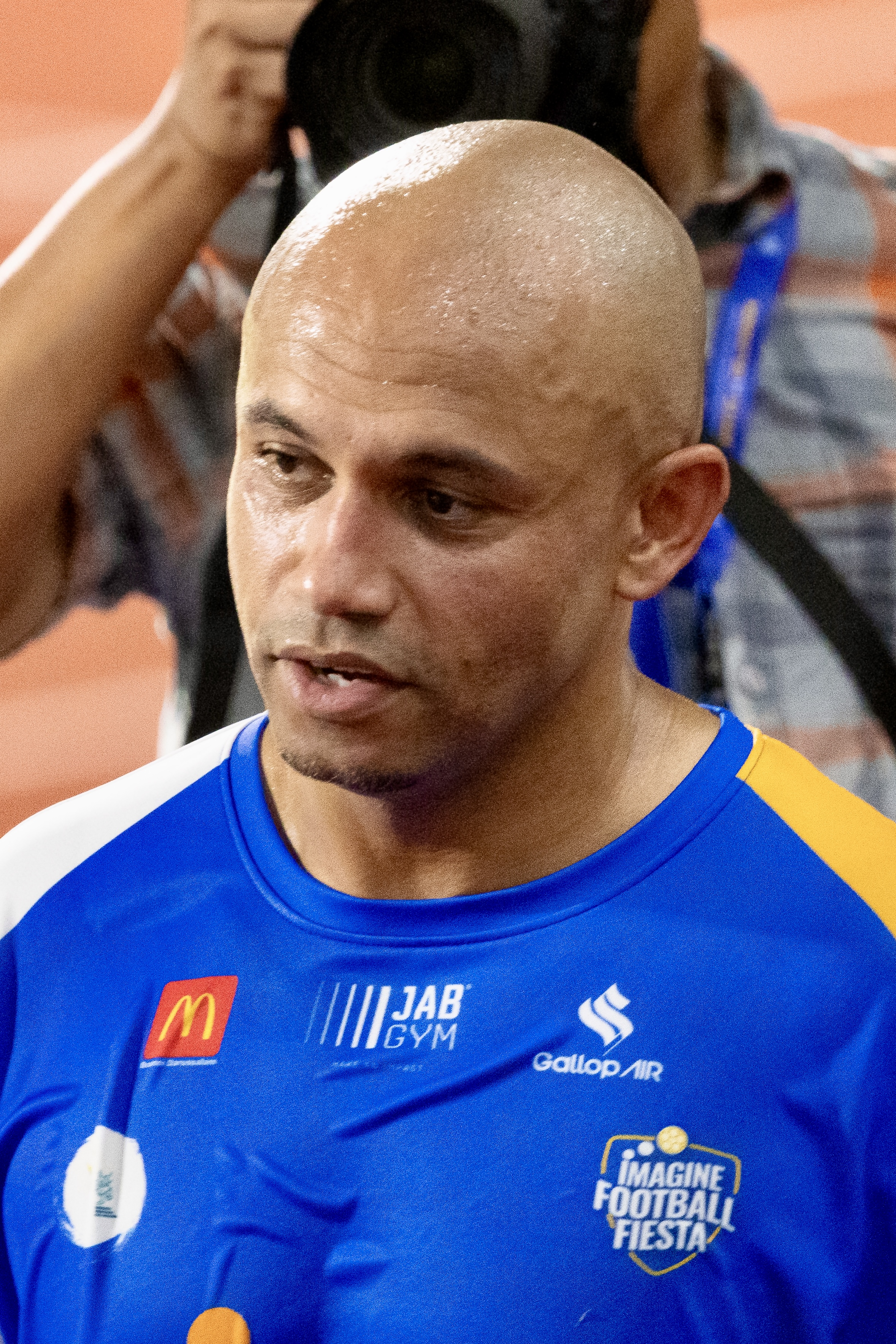
- Webber in 2024

Personal information
- Full name: Daniel Vaughn Webber
- Date of birth: 28 December 1981 (age 44)
- Place of birth: Manchester, England
- Height: 5 ft 9 in (1.75 m)
- Position: Striker

Youth career
- Fletcher Moss Rangers
- 1996–1998: Manchester United

Senior career*
Years	Team	Apps	(Gls)
1998–2003	Manchester United	0	(0)
2001	→ Port Vale (loan)	4	(0)
2002	→ Watford (loan)	5	(2)
2002	→ Watford (loan)	12	(2)
2003–2005	Watford	55	(17)
2005	→ Sheffield United (loan)	7	(3)
2005–2009	Sheffield United	107	(20)
2009–2011	Portsmouth	25	(1)
2012	Leeds United	13	(1)
2013	Doncaster Rovers	0	(0)
2013–2014	Accrington Stanley	22	(3)
2014–2016	Salford City	56	(38)
Total		306	(87)

International career
2002	England U20	5	(0)
- * Club domestic league appearances and goals

Daniel Vaughn Webber (born 28 December 1981) is an English former professional football striker. He represented England under-20s in 2002.

Born in Manchester, Webber began his career as a trainee with Manchester United but failed to cement a first-team place and spent loan spells with Port Vale and Watford before joining Watford permanently. After two years with Watford, Webber joined Sheffield United for the second half of the 2004–05 season. That loan also became a permanent transfer at the end of the season, and during the 2005–06 season, Webber's goals helped Sheffield United to promotion to the Premier League for 2006–07. Three years later, after scoring 20 goals in 107 league appearances for the Blades, Webber's contract was allowed to expire, and he was released from the club. He then joined Portsmouth for an injury-plagued two-year spell.

He signed a short-term deal with Leeds United in February 2012 and, after being released at the end of the season, was left without a club until he joined Doncaster Rovers in March 2013 on non-contract terms. He signed with Accrington Stanley in July 2013, where he remained for one season before joining non-League side Salford City in August 2014, helping the side to win the Northern Premier League Division One North title in 2014–15, and then promotion out of the Premier Division play-offs in 2015–16, before he announced his retirement in July 2016.

== Club career ==
=== Manchester United ===
Webber started playing at Fletcher Moss Rangers, and after some appearances for the Manchester United's youth team during the 1997–98 season, Webber began his footballing career as a trainee in July 1998. After scoring 16 goals in 11 appearances for the Under-17 side, including five goals against Fulham, Webber was rewarded with a professional contract on 28 December 1998. Despite only scoring one more goal between then and the end of the 1998–99 season, Webber finished as the Under-17s' top scorer.

He progressed to the Under-19s in 1999–2000, for whom he scored 11 goals in 14 appearances. He also made his first appearances for the reserve team during that season, playing in matches against Bradford City, Newcastle United and Manchester City. In 2000–01, Webber established himself in the reserve side, scoring six goals in 20 appearances, and made his debut for the first-team in November 2000 in a League Cup match against Sunderland.

He made a second appearance for Manchester United in the League Cup in November 2001, and then joined Port Vale on a one-month loan. He made five appearances for Port Vale, returning to Manchester United at the end of his loan spell as he felt that the departure of Andy Cole from the club at the end of December 2001 would enhance his first-team opportunities. He did not break into the first team, however, and in March 2002, he joined First Division club Watford on loan for the rest of the season, where he scored two goals in five League appearances.

He joined Watford again for the start of the 2002–03 season on a three-month loan. He impressed Watford manager Ray Lewington, who said, "Danny's come down from Manchester United, and he has enthusiasm and a willingness to work. He's an absolute credit." His loan spell came to an end in October 2002 after he dislocated his shoulder in a match against Sheffield Wednesday. He made a third appearance for Manchester United as a substitute in the Champions League match against Deportivo de La Coruña in March 2003. At the end of the season, he was offered a three-year contract. Still, he turned it down to seek first-team football, saying, "When I was 16, I made the decision that if I was still around at 21 and not in the first team, I'd have to be professional and go and play first-team football somewhere else. I was a bit disappointed that I hadn't broken through but there's no point thinking about what could have been.".

=== Watford ===
Webber joined Watford on a three-year contract in the summer of 2003. He made 31 league and cup appearances in the 2003–04 season, scoring five goals, with a shoulder injury suffered in training in February 2004 restricting his appearance for the rest of the season. Webber made a good start to the 2004–05 season, scoring nine goals by mid-October 2004, with manager Ray Lewington saying, "He has got mind and body right this year and is showing the potential we all knew he had. He is doing extremely well. And this season Danny is scoring tap ins as well as spectacular goals." However, his season was interrupted by a dislocated shoulder suffered during a match against Gillingham in November 2004, and he was later dropped from the first-team in March 2005 owing to poor form. Shortly afterwards, he joined Sheffield United on loan. Webber scored 12 goals in 32 league and cup appearances for Watford in the 2004–05 season.

=== Sheffield United ===
Webber initially joined Sheffield United on loan in March 2005 with Danny Cullip moving in the opposite direction. He scored after 93 seconds on his debut in a 4–0 away win over rivals Leeds United, and four days later, scored two goals against Queens Park Rangers. At the end of the 2004–05 season, he signed a permanent three-year contract with Sheffield United for a transfer fee of £500,000.

During the 2005–06 season, Webber scored ten goals, helping Sheffield United to win automatic promotion from the Championship to the Premier League. In the 2006–07 season he played 22 games in the Premier League, scoring three goals, including the winning goals against Newcastle United and former club Watford.

After the "Blades" were relegated, Webber continued to appear regularly but struggled with injuries and an inability to turn appearances into goals. By the 2008–09 season he was in the final year of his contract and hoped to secure a new deal with the club but more injuries saw him drop out of the first-team reckoning. After the club missed out on promotion, Webber's contract was allowed to expire, and he was released. Numerous clubs courted him in the summer and he was closely linked with Crystal Palace before Palace manager Neil Warnock stated that "it looks as if Danny will be going to Middlesbrough, it's difficult for us to compete with their money".

=== Portsmouth ===
In September 2009, Webber signed for Portsmouth, who was looking for attacking options. He signed outside the transfer window as he was a free agent. He scored his first goal for the club in a 3–1 League Cup victory over Carlisle United on 22 September. Webber scored his first Premier League goal for Portsmouth in a 1–1 home draw against West Ham United on 26 January 2010. He was ruled out for the remainder of the season after rupturing cruciate ligaments in a game against Tottenham Hotspur two months later. He received a runners-up medal for the 2010 FA Cup final defeat to Chelsea. However, he was unable to take part in the final itself. Webber remained in the treatment room for much of the 2010–11 campaign, before he made his return to action in a 2–0 defeat to Reading at the Madejski Stadium on 2 April, making a cameo appearance for the last five minutes. His contract was not renewed at the end of the season.

In July 2011, Webber joined Premier League newcomers Queens Park Rangers on a trial basis, who were managed by his former (and current) manager Neil Warnock He scored three goals for QPR in pre-season, one in a 13–0 win over Tavistock, and two in a 7–0 win against Bodmin Town. In December, Webber had a trial spell at Scottish Premier League club Celtic. Later in the month he began training with League One side Huddersfield Town. In February 2012, Webber joined Birmingham City on trial with a view to signing a permanent contract. In February, there was also reported interest from Chinese club Guangzhou Evergrande.

=== Leeds United ===
Webber went to Elland Road on a trial basis, and on 28 February he joined the Championship club on a deal lasting until the end of the season, making him Neil Warnock's first signing as Leeds United manager. Webber made his debut as a substitute in a 1–0 home defeat to Southampton on 3 March. He then made his first start for Leeds three days later, in a 0–0 draw with Hull City at the KC Stadium. Webber scored his first goal for Leeds coming off the bench in the final game of the season against Leicester City on 28 April. On 2 May 2012, Webber was told that his contract would not be renewed and that he was free to find another club.

=== Doncaster Rovers ===
He went on trial at Brian Flynn's Doncaster Rovers in March 2013 and signed on a non-contractual basis shortly after. Rovers won promotion as League One champions at the end of the 2012–13 season, though Webber never made it onto the pitch.

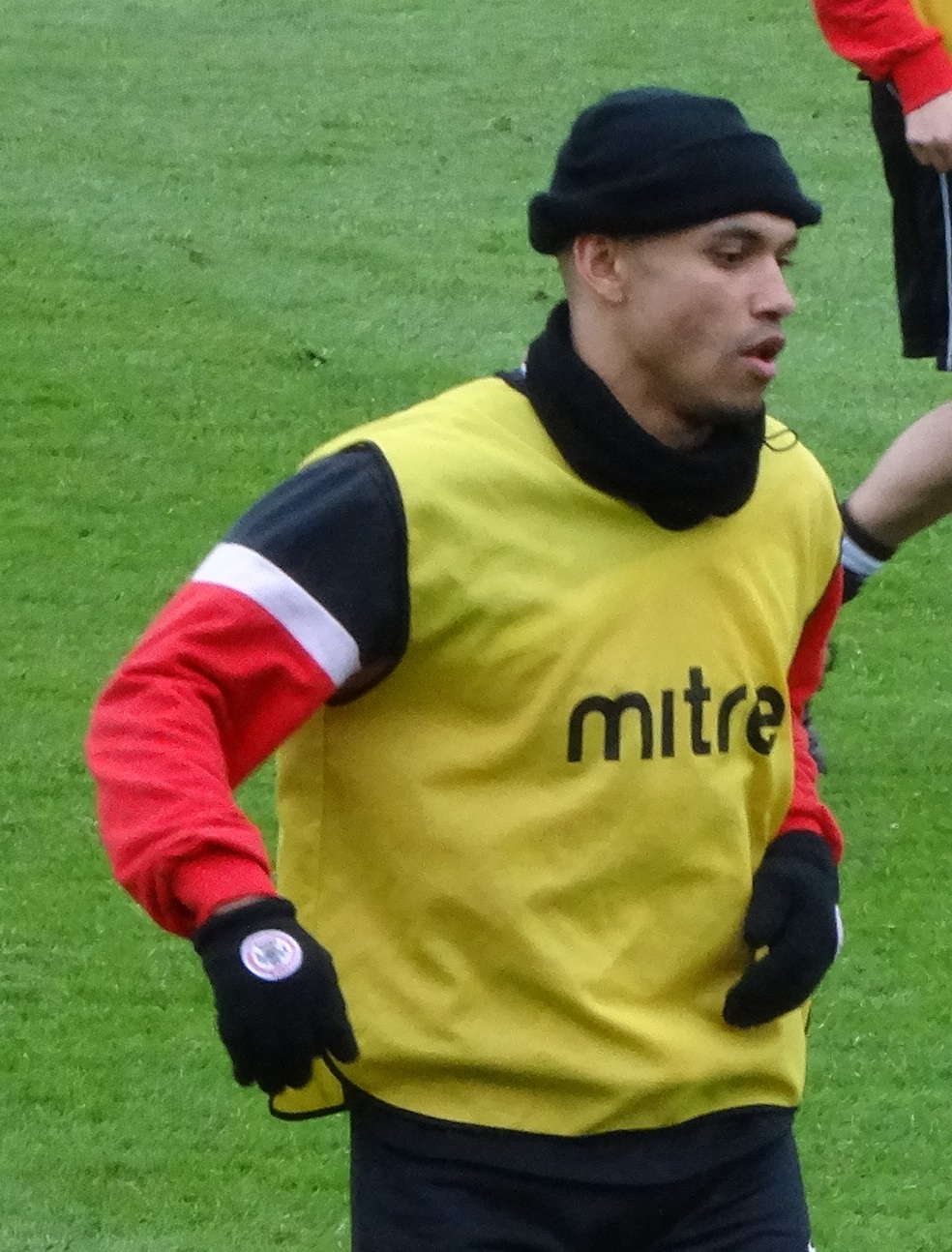
Webber playing for Accrington Stanley in 2014

=== Accrington Stanley ===
Webber signed a one-year contract with League Two club Accrington Stanley in July 2013; he joined Stanley after being attracted to the club by manager James Beattie, his former teammate at Sheffield United. He scored on his debut on 3 August, in a 4–1 defeat to Newport County at Rodney Parade. He ended the 2013–14 campaign with three goals in 23 appearances for Stanley. He was not offered a new contract in the summer.

=== Salford City ===
Webber signed with Northern Premier League Division One North club Salford City in August 2014. He made his club debut in the opening league match of the season on 16 August as Salford beat Scarborough Athletic 4–1. The "Ammies" won promotion as champions in the 2014–15 season. He scored Salford's opening goal in the 2–0 FA Cup first round giant-killing over Notts County on 6 November 2015. Salford went on to win promotion out of the Premier Division via the play-offs in 2016 after a 3–2 victory over Workington. He announced his retirement in July 2016, so as to focus his life on his family and his work for a football agency company.

== International career ==
Webber played five times for England at under-20 level in 2002.

== Personal life ==
His stepfather, Darren Beckford, had a 14-year playing career in professional football. His cousin, Ethan Beckford, has also played professional football.

== Career statistics ==
Appearances and goals by club, season and competition
Club	Season	League			FA Cup		League Cup		Other		Total	
Club	Season	Division	Apps	Goals	Apps	Goals	Apps	Goals	Apps	Goals	Apps	Goals
Manchester United	2000–01	Premier League	0	0	0	0	1	0	0	0	1	0
Manchester United	2001–02	Premier League	0	0	0	0	1	0	0	0	1	0
Manchester United	2002–03	Premier League	0	0	0	0	0	0	1 (Note: Appearance in the UEFA Champions League.)	0	1	0
Manchester United	Total		0	0	0	0	2	0	1	0	3	0
Port Vale (loan)	2001–02	Second Division	4	0	0	0	—		1 (Note: Appearance(s) in the Football League Trophy.)	0	5	0
Watford	2001–02	First Division	5	2	—		—		—		5	2
Watford	2002–03	First Division	12	2	0	0	0	0	—		12	2
Watford	2003–04	First Division	27	5	2	0	2	0	—		31	5
Watford	2004–05	Championship	28	12	2	0	2	0	—		32	12
Watford	Total		72	21	4	0	4	0	0	0	80	21
Sheffield United	2004–05	Championship	7	3	—		—		—		7	3
Sheffield United	2005–06	Championship	35	10	0	0	2	0	—		37	10
Sheffield United	2006–07	Premier League	22	3	1	0	1	0	—		24	3
Sheffield United	2007–08	Championship	14	3	0	0	2	1	—		16	4
Sheffield United	2008–09	Championship	36	4	2	1	3	1	0	0	41	6
Sheffield United	Total		114	23	3	1	8	2	0	0	125	26
Portsmouth	2009–10	Premier League	17	1	4	0	3	2	—		24	3
Portsmouth	2010–11	Championship	8	0	0	0	0	0	—		8	0
Portsmouth	Total		25	1	4	0	3	2	0	0	32	3
Leeds United	2011–12	Championship	13	1	—		—		—		13	1
Doncaster Rovers	2012–13	League One	0	0	—		—		—		0	0
Accrington Stanley	2013–14	League Two	22	3	0	0	0	0	1	0	23	3
Career total (Note: Statistics for Salford City not recorded.)			250	49	11	1	17	4	3	0	281	54

== Honours ==
Sheffield United

- Championship second-place promotion: 2005–06

Salford City

- Northern Premier League Division One North: 2014–15
- Northern Premier League Premier Division play-offs: 2016
