= Mikele Leigertwood =

Footballer (born 1982)

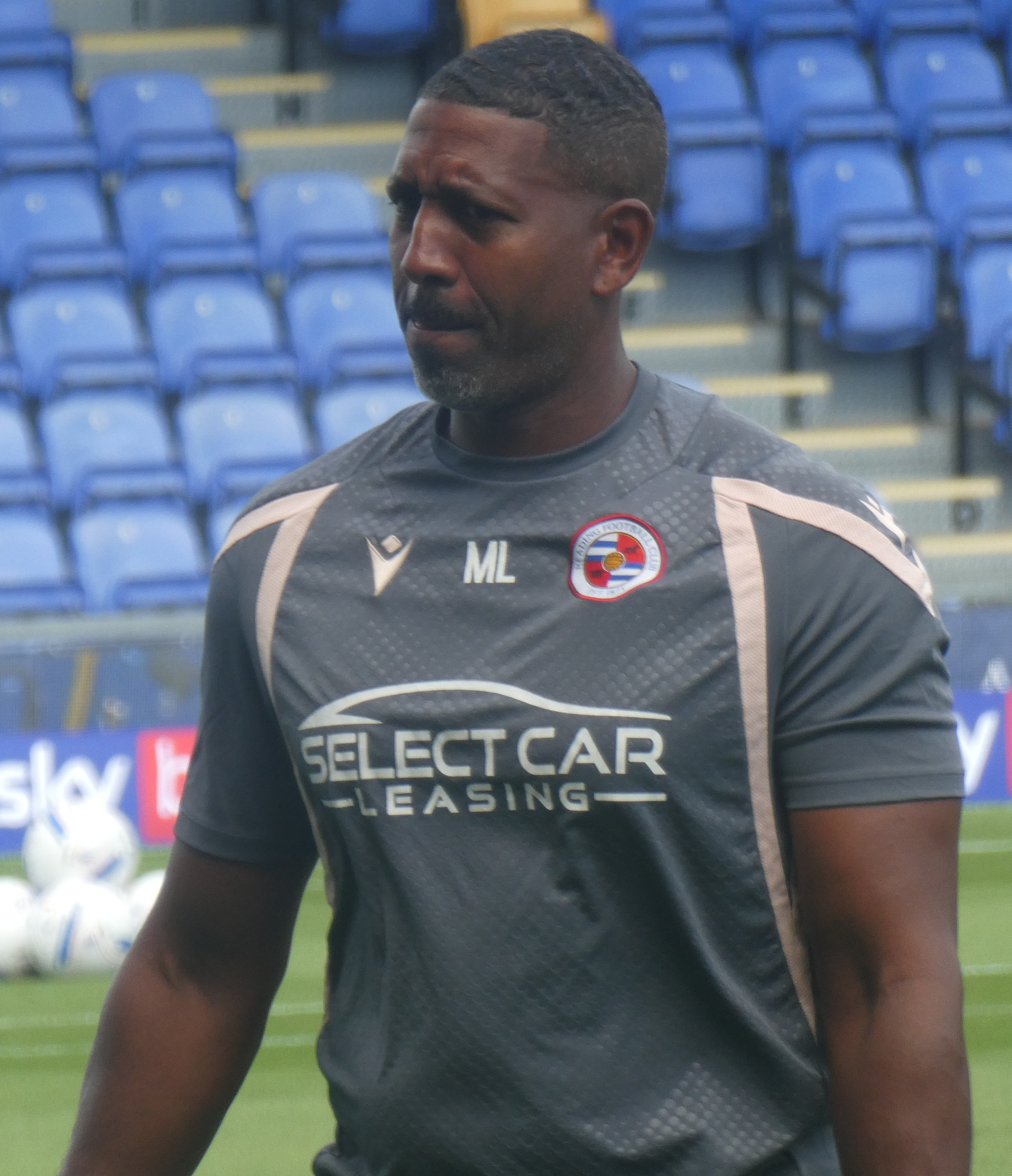
- Leigertwood with Reading in 2026

Personal information
- Full name: Mikele Benjamin Leigertwood
- Date of birth: 12 November 1982 (age 43)
- Place of birth: Enfield, London, England
- Position: Defensive midfielder

Team information
- Current team: Reading (first team coach)

Youth career
- Wimbledon

Senior career*
Years	Team	Apps	(Gls)
2001–2004	Wimbledon	56	(2)
2001–2002	→ Leyton Orient (loan)	8	(0)
2004–2006	Crystal Palace	59	(1)
2006–2007	Sheffield United	21	(0)
2007–2011	Queens Park Rangers	131	(12)
2010–2011	→ Reading (loan)	22	(1)
2011–2014	Reading	75	(6)
Total		372	(22)

International career
2008–2012	Antigua and Barbuda	11	(1)

Managerial career
- 2021: Antigua and Barbuda (assistant coach)
- 2021–2024: Antigua and Barbuda
- * Club domestic league appearances and goals

Mikele Benjamin Leigertwood (born 12 November 1982) is a former professional footballer who played as a defensive midfielder. Born in England, he represented the Antigua and Barbuda national team at international level. He is currently a first team coach at Reading.

== Club career ==
=== Wimbledon ===
Born in Enfield, Leigertwood began his career with Wimbledon. After progressing through the ranks at Wimbledon, he was one of a number of youngsters called up to the first team by the manager Terry Burton in September 2001. After his loan spell at Leyton Orient ended, he was given his first game for Wimbledon at the end of the 2001–02 season in a 1–0 defeat against Barnsley.

In November 2001, Leigertwood was loaned out to Leyton Orient and made his professional debut in a 3–0 win over Oxford United. His performances quickly led to the extension of his loan spell at Leyton Orient on two occasions. Leigertwood went on to make eight appearances for Leyton Orient before returning to his parent club.

At the start of the 2002–03 season, Leigertwood began to establish himself in the starting eleven for the side. However, it wasn't until 1 October 2002 that he scored his first goal for Wimbledon against Portsmouth in the League Cup. Leigertwood continued to hold down a first team spot until he suffered injuries in early March. While on the sidelines, he signed a contract extension that tied him to the club until 2006. He returned from injury on 7 April 2003, starting a 1–0 win over Sheffield United. By the end of the 2002–03 season, Leigertwood had made thirty–three appearances, scoring once in all competitions.

At the start of the 2003–04 season, Wimbledon entered administration. Up until his departure from the club, Leigertwood started every match in the first half of the season. On 26 August 2003, he scored his first goal of the season in a 3–2 loss against Norwich City. and his second of the season on 25 October 200, in a 3–1 loss against Watford. When leaving Wimbledon, he had played 65 games, scoring three times.

=== Crystal Palace ===
He transferred to Crystal Palace for £155,000 in January 2004, becoming the first permanent signing of Iain Dowie. Upon joining Crystal Palace, Leigertwood revealed he had turned down move to other clubs in order to join The Eagles.

Leigertwood made his Crystal Palace debut as a late substitute in a 6–3 win over Stoke City on 14 February 2004. After making his debut, he played in 10 league games during the remainder of the 2003–04 season, helping Crystal Palace secure promotion to the FA Premier League after defeating West Ham United in the play-off final to win promotion to the Premiership.

In the 2004–05 season, Leigertwood didn't make his first start of the season until 26 October 2004 in a 2–1 win over South London rivals, Charlton Athletic in the third round of the League Cup. Following his first appearance of the season, Leigertwood began to enjoy a run of first team football. On 22 January 2005, he scored his first goal for the club against Tottenham Hotspur. Leigertwood spent the rest of the 2004–05 season playing in defence and midfield, but he was unsuccessful in helping to prevent Crystal Palace from being relegated from the Premier League on the final day of the season. By the end of the 2004–05 season, Leigertwood had made 23 appearances, scoring once.

In the 2005–06 season, Leigertwood continued to feature in the first team, playing four matches for the side. However, he was kept out by an ankle injury for two months. and did not return to first team action 22 November 2005, coming on as a late substitute in a 1–0 win over Coventry City. After making his return to the first team, Leigertwood held his place until he suffered a thigh injury in mid–January. After recovering from a thigh injury, Leigertwood retained his place for the rest of the season. Around this time, the club began negotiations with Leigertwood over a new contract. However, it was reported in the British newspaper that he had refused to sign. At the end of the 2005–06 season, which saw Palace miss out on a return to the Premier League after losing 1–0 to Watford in the play-offs, Leigertwood went on to make thirty appearances in all competitions. Shortly after the play-offs, he was offered a new contract by the club.

=== Sheffield United ===
After Palace's relegation Crystal Palace, he joined Sheffield United on a three-year deal after the Blades paid a fee of £600,000. Although Leigertwood was out of contract, compensation was due as he was under 24 years of age at the time.

Leigertwood made his Sheffield United debut as a 75th-minute substitute in a 1–1 draw against Liverpool in the opening game of the season, quickly establishing himself a first team regular, until he suffered an ankle injury in early December. It wasn't until on 30 December 2006 when he made his return from injury, coming on as a substitute in the 63rd minute in a 1–0 win over Arsenal. His return was short–lived, however, when Leigertwood suffered an ankle injury that kept him out for months and was subsequently plagued with injuries later in the 2006–07 season. Sheffield United were relegated from the Premier League after losing 2–1 to Wigan Athletic in the last game of the season, making it the second time that Leigertwood had suffered relegation from the Premier League. By the end of the 2006–07 season, he had made nineteen appearances for the side.

At the start of the 2007–08 season, Leigertwood made four appearances, despite struggling to hold down a first team place since the club's relegation from the Premier League.

=== Queens Park Rangers ===
Leigertwood joined Queens Park Rangers for a fee of £900,000 on 31 August 2007.

Leigertwood made his Queens Park Rangers debut the next day on 1 September 2007, starting a 3–0 loss against Southampton. He scored his first Queens Park Rangers goal in a 1–1 draw against Leicester City. A week later, on 22 September, Leigertwood was sent– ff in the 81st minute of a 1–1 draw against Watford for a second bookable offence. Leigertwood scored his second goal for the club in a 2–0 win over Hull City on 3 November 2007. A month later, on 27 December 2007, he was sent off for the second time that season in the final minutes f a 2–1 loss against Plymouth Argyle, as a result of which Leigertwood served a three match suspension. He scored three more goals in the 2007–08 season, including a brace in a 3–0 win over Stoke City on 2 March 2008. Leigertwood became a first team regular for the side, finishing his first season at the club with forty appearances and scoring five times in all competitions.

In the 2008–09 season, Leigertwood continued as a first team regular, playing either as right–back or in midfield. Leigertwood started the season well when he set up three goals in as many matches between 23 August 2008 and 14 September 2008. Leigertwood received a red card and four match ban in a match against Birmingham City on 28 October 2008 for a challenge on Lee Carsley. His performance at Queens Park Rangers attracted interest in the January transfer window, when he was reportedly "wanted by three clubs ready to shell out a £1m-plus" for him. It wasn't until on 17 January 2009 when Leigterwood scored his first goal of the season, in a 2–0 win over Derby County. Two months later on 17 March 2009, he scored his second goal of the season, in a 1–0 win over Swansea City. By the end of the 2008–09 season, Leigertwood had made forty–six appearances, scoring twice in all competitions.

In the 2009–10 season, Leigterwood started the season well when he scored his first goal of the season in a 1–1 draw against Nottingham Forest on 23 August 2009. His second goal came on 26 September 2009 in a 5–2 win over Barnsley. His 100th appearance for the club came on 30 October 2009 in a 2–1 loss against Leicester City. He continued to regain his first team place for the side. Leigterwood also captained the side in the number of matches in the absence of Martin Rowlands. Leigterwood scored two goals in two matches on 19 December 2009 and 26 December 2009. Shortly after, he signed a three–year contract, keeping him at the club until 2012. In a 1–0 win over Peterborough United on 6 February 2010, he was sent off for a professional foul on Tommy Rowe. Two months later on 24 April 2010, Leigertwood scored his fifth goal of the season in a 1–0 win over Barnsley. Despite missing several matches due to injury and suspension, he went on to make forty–five appearances, scoring five times in all competitions.

In the 2010–11 season, Leigertwood found his playing time at Queens Park Rangers reduced and mostly came on as a substitute. As a result, he fell out of favour with Neil Warnock. By the time of his departure, he had made nine appearances for the side in the 2010–11 season. During his time at Queens Park Rangers, he made 141 appearances and scored 12 goals.

=== Reading ===
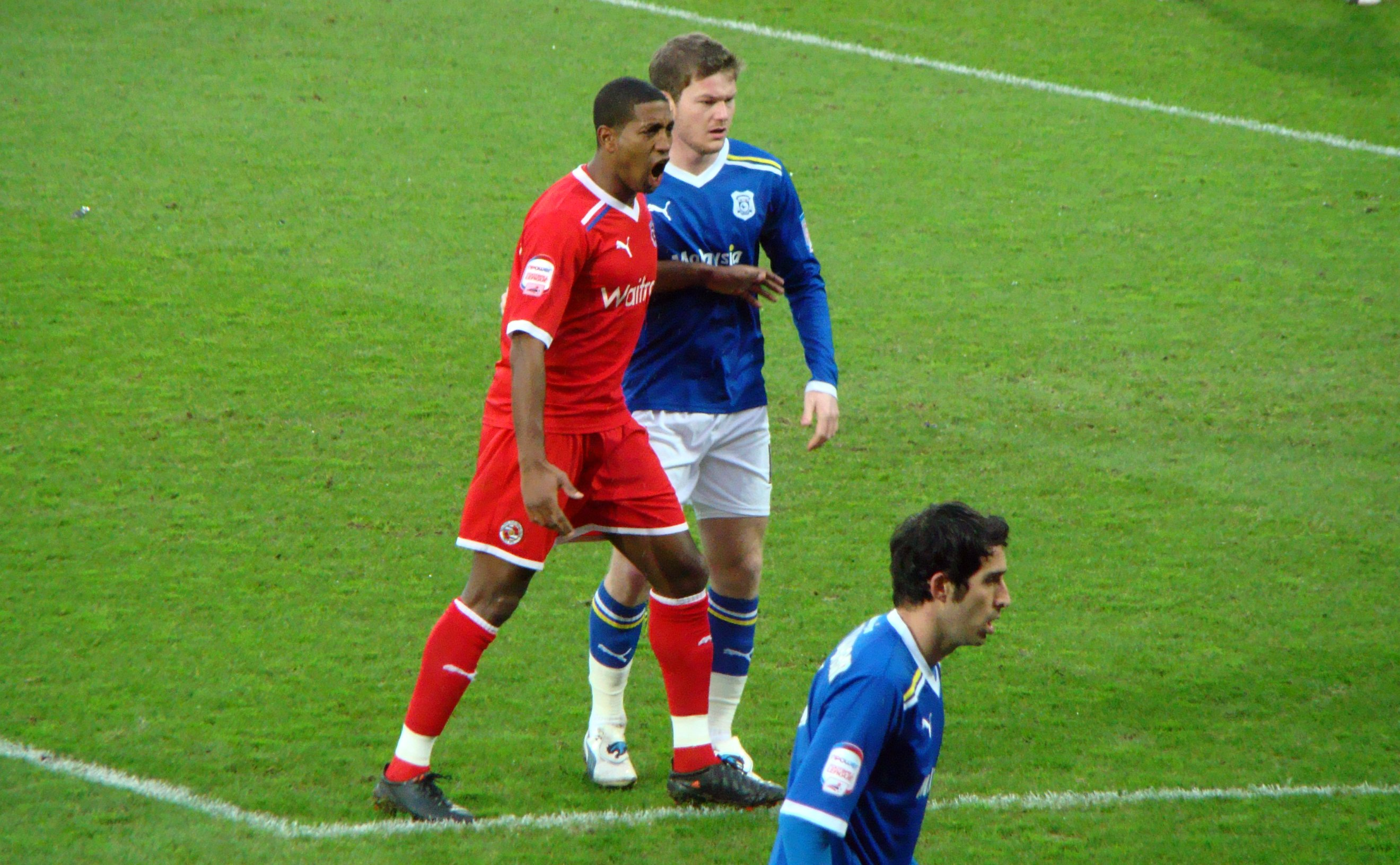
Leigertwood being marked by Cardiff City's Aron Gunnarsson during the Cardiff City and Reading match on 2 January 2012.

Leigertwood went on loan to Reading for two months on 23 November 2010. On 27 November 2010, he made his Reading debut, coming off in the 77th minute in a 0–0 draw against Leeds United. Leigertwood quickly became a first team regular for the side. After a series of consistently good performances, this was extended to the end of the 2010–11 season. He scored his first goal for the club against Stevenage in the FA Cup on 29 January 2011. A week later Leigertwood added another goal to his tally with a 21st minute deflected strike against Cardiff City in a 2–2 draw. During the match, Leigertwood punched Michael Chopra "after a confrontation involving both sets of players, but immediately admitted his part in the melee" and served a three match suspension. After serving his suspension, his performance earned him the Reading Post AHG Group-sponsored Player of the Month award for February. He helped the side reach fifth place and qualify for the Championship play–offs. Leigertwood played all three matches in the Championship play–offs, as Reading lost 4–2 against Swansea City in the Championship play-off final. Despite missing out several matches due to injury and suspension, he went on to make twenty–nine appearances, scoring twice in all competitions.

In May 2011, it was announced that Reading had signed Leigertwood on a three-year contract. Leigertwood's first game after signing for the club on a permanent basis was the opening game of the season, a 2–2 draw against Millwall. After joining the club on a permanent basis, he quickly established him in the starting eleven. However, his performances at the start of the season came under criticism from Reading supporters. Despite this, Leigertwood's first goal of the 2011–12 season came at home to Southampton in a 1–1 draw on 22 October 2011. Leigertwood started in every match until he suffered a thigh injury that saw him miss three matches. After returning to the first team from injury, he quickly regained his first team place for the side. His second goal of the campaign came at home to Leicester City in a 3–1 win, and this was followed up with strikes against Blackpool and West Ham United as Reading surged towards promotion with an incredible run of games of which Leigertwood was an important figure in. After returning from a knee injury, he returned to the starting line-up, where he key role Leigertwood had played was rewarded when he scored the winning goal in a 1–0 victory at home to Nottingham Forest, which secured Reading's promotion back to the top flight after a four-year absence. At the end of the 2011–12 season, he went on to make forty–two appearances, scoring five times in all competitions.

In the 2012–13 season, Leigertwood regained his first team place, with the club playing in the Premier League. In early–October, however, he suffered ankle injury that saw him sidelined for one match. After returning from injury, he scored his first Premier League goal for Reading in a 3–3 draw with Fulham with a superb strike from 20 yards on 27 October 2012. Three days later, on 30 October 2012, he scored his second goal for the club, in the League Cup campaign, as Reading lost 7–5 against Arsenal in a match in which Arsenal were 4–0 down before coming back to win 7–5 after extra-time. After being sidelined in early–2013 due to injury, Leigterwood then captained the side for the first time and scored his third goal of the season, in a 4–0 win over Sheffield United in the third round of the FA Cup. He continued to be in the starting line-up until he was dropped from the first team for the rest of the 2012–13 season, as Leigterwood went on to make thirty–four appearances and scoring three times in all competitions. Metro named Leigertwood among the Premier League's worst XI of the season.

Prior to the 2013–14 season, Leigertwood suffered an ankle injury during pre–season, having been under the knife since May. In September 2013, he returned to training after recovering from the ankle injury. Upon returning to training from injury, Leigterwood's return was praised by Manager Nigel Adkins. However, his return was short–lived and his injury plagued was plagued throughout 2013 and early 2014. By March, Leigterwood returned to training. After a year out injured, Leigertwood made his Reading return on 8 April 2014. In the follow–up match, however, he came on as a substitute for Danny Williams in the 61st minute but was sent off for a second bookable offence in a 1–1 draw against Leicester City. After missing out two matches, Leigertwood went on to play the final two matches for the side. By the end of the 2013–14 season, Leigertwood had made four appearances for the side.

On 6 May 2014, Leigertwood was released from Reading, along with five other players and in July joined Nottingham Forest on trial. Whilst on trial, Leigertwood sustained a hip injury which forced him to retire from the game, although this was not officially confirmed until the following year.

== International career ==
Leigertwood is eligible to represent Antigua and Barbuda. Willie Donachie, Antigua and Barbuda's manager, tried to bring Leigertwood into the squad for a World Cup qualifier in June 2008, but the player had a wedding to attend. He was also eligible to represent Saint Vincent and the Grenadines.

While serving a four match ban after receiving a red card against Birmingham City on 28 October 2008, he accepted a call up for the 2008 Caribbean Championship to represent Antigua and Barbuda. He made his international debut on 5 November 2008 in a 3–2 loss against Trinidad and Tobago and scored his first goal in their next match against Guyana. In November 2010, he returned to the national team and participated in the second stage of the 2010 Caribbean Championship, playing in all three matches.

== Post–playing career ==
After retiring from professional football, Leigertwood took up a coaching role at Maccabi London Lions as their Sunday Team Coach.

On 19 July 2016 Leigertwood returned to Reading as Academy Loan Manager.

On 13 December 2024 Leigertwood became a first team coach at Reading.

== Personal life ==
In March 2010, Leigertwood was involved in Kick It Out's latest campaign, which aimed to raise awareness of homophobia in football. During his time at Reading, he became the Royals' 'Reading Stars' ambassador.

Growing up, he supported Arsenal. Leigertwood is good friends with Jobi McAnuff, the two having known each other since school and been teammates at Wimbledon, Crystal Palace and Reading. He has two children.

== Career statistics ==
=== Club ===
Appearances and goals by club, season and competition
Club	Season	League			FA Cup		League Cup		Other		Total	
Club	Season	Division	Apps	Goals	Apps	Goals	Apps	Goals	Apps	Goals	Apps	Goals
Wimbledon	2001–02	Division One	1	0	0	0	0	0	—		1	0
Wimbledon	2002–03	Division One	28	0	2	0	3	1	—		33	1
Wimbledon	2003–04	Division One	27	2	3	0	1	0	—		31	2
Wimbledon	Total		56	2	5	0	4	1	—		65	3
Leyton Orient (loan)	2001–02	Division Three	8	0	2	0	0	0	0	0	10	0
Crystal Palace	2003–04	Division One	12	0	0	0	0	0	3 (Note: Appearance(s) in Division One play-offs)	0	15	0
Crystal Palace	2004–05	Premier League	20	1	1	0	2	0	—		23	1
Crystal Palace	2005–06	Championship	27	0	1	0	1	0	1 (Note: Appearance(s) in Championship play-offs)	0	30	0
Crystal Palace	Total		59	1	2	0	3	0	4	0	68	1
Sheffield United	2006–07	Premier League	19	0	0	0	0	0	—		19	0
Sheffield United	2007–08	Championship	2	0	0	0	2	0	—		4	0
Sheffield United	Total		21	0	0	0	2	0	—		23	0
Queens Park Rangers	2007–08	Championship	40	5	0	0	0	0	—		40	5
Queens Park Rangers	2008–09	Championship	42	2	2	0	2	0	—		46	2
Queens Park Rangers	2009–10	Championship	40	5	2	0	3	0	—		45	5
Queens Park Rangers	2010–11	Championship	9	0	0	0	1	0	—		10	0
Queens Park Rangers	Total		131	12	4	0	6	0	—		141	12
Reading	2010–11 (Note: This season was spent on loan from Queens Park Rangers)	Championship	22	1	4	1	0	0	3	0	29	2
Reading	2011–12	Championship	41	5	1	0	0	0	—		42	5
Reading	2012–13	Premier League	30	1	2	1	2	1	—		34	3
Reading	2013–14	Championship	4	0	0	0	0	0	—		4	0
Reading	Total		97	7	7	2	2	1	3	0	109	10
Career total			372	22	20	2	17	2	7	0	416	26

=== International ===
Appearances and goals by national team and year
National team	Year	Apps	Goals
Antigua and Barbuda	2008	3	1
Antigua and Barbuda	2009	0	0
Antigua and Barbuda	2010	3	0
Antigua and Barbuda	2011	3	0
Antigua and Barbuda	2012	2	0
Total		11	1

Scores and results list Antigua and Barbuda's goal tally first, score column indicates score after each Leigertwood goal.

List of international goals scored by Mikele Leigertwood
No.	Date	Venue	Opponent	Score	Result	Competition
1	7 November 2008	Marvin Lee Stadium, Macoya, Trinidad and Tobago	Guyana	1–0	2-1	2008 Caribbean Championship

=== Manager ===
As of 19 November 2024

Managerial record by team and tenure
Team	From	To	Record				
Team	From	To	P	W	D	L	Win %
Antigua and Barbuda	20 March 2021	Present	65	14	10	41	21.54
Total			65	14	10	41	21.54

== Honours ==
Crystal Palace

- Football League First Division play-offs: 2004

Reading

- Football League Championship: 2011–12
