= James Ashmore (footballer) =

English footballer (born 1986)

Personal information
- Full name: James Charles Ashmore
- Date of birth: 2 March 1986 (age 40)
- Place of birth: Sheffield, England
- Position: Midfielder

Team information
- Current team: Worksop Town

Youth career
- 2003–2007: Sheffield United

Senior career*
Years	Team	Apps	(Gls)
2007–2008	Sheffield United	0	(0)
2008	→ Macclesfield Town (loan)	8	(0)
2008–2010	Ferencváros	30	(5)
2009–2010	Ferencváros II	2	(1)
2010–	Worksop Town	2	(0)
- * Club domestic league appearances and goals as of 19:49, 9 January 2010 (UTC)

James Charles Ashmore (born 2 March 1986) is an English footballer who plays for Worksop Town in the Northern Premier League.

== Playing career ==
=== Sheffield United ===
A graduate of the Blades Academy who impressed at every junior level after signing at the age of 10, Ashmore is a central midfielder who can also operate in wide areas and at full-back. He was offered a one-year professional deal in the summer of 2007 and has been a regular fixture in United's reserves.

Along with teammates Colin Marrison and Ryan Gyaki, Ashmore played as a trialist for Football League One side Yeovil Town at Huish Park against Welton Rovers in the Somerset Premier Cup on 3 October 2006.

Ashmore started the 2007–08 season on the fringes of the first team squad playing in a friendly against Worksop and impressed alongside established first team players in a midfield holding role. During the subsequent pre-season tour of Ireland, Ashmore scored a goal for the senior side; a 15-yard volley against Portadown after coming on as a 74th-minute substitute.

James joined Macclesfield Town on loan in January 2008 for the remainder of the season, during which time he played eight games. He was released by Sheffield United at the end of the season.

=== Ferencváros ===
Having been released by Sheffield United, Ashmore signed a one-year deal with their partner club, Ferencváros, managed by former Blade and Everton defender Craig Short.

=== Worksop Town ===
In September 2010, Ashmore returned to England to sign for Evo-Stik Northern Premier Division outfit Worksop Town. Due to issues over international clearance, He had to wait until 9 October to make his debut, coming on as a substitute for Jamie Jackson in the 3–0 win over Ashton United.
