= Sharu Naraji =

Iranian former professional footballer (born 1984)

Personal information
- Date of birth: 7 February 1984 (age 42)
- Place of birth: Bolton, England
- Position: Winger

Youth career
- 2000–2004: Esteghlal

Senior career*
Years	Team	Apps	(Gls)
2004–2005	Esteghlal		
2004	→ Torino (loan)	0	(0)
2004–2005	→ Real Zaragoza (loan)	0	(0)
2005–2007	Sheffield United	0	(0)

International career
- Iran U20
- * Club domestic league appearances and goals

Sharu Naraji (born 7 February 1984) is an Iranian former professional footballer who played as a winger.

== Early and personal life ==
Naraji was born in Bolton, England, and grew up in Iran. He is the older brother of fellow player Shana Haji.

== Career ==
=== Club career ===
Naraji began his career with Esteghlal, and spent loan spells in Italy with Torino and in Spain with Real Zaragoza. He signed a one-year contract with English side Sheffield United in August 2005, before signing a contract extension a year later. He was released by United in May 2007, having never made an appearance for them in the Football League. His career was ended by injury.

He was praised by Neil Warnock and former Sheffield United captain Chris Morgan, who compared him with Bayern Munich's Arjen Robben.

=== International career ===
After playing with the Iranian under-20 team, Naraji was called up to the senior squad in October 2005. However, due to injury, Naraji was unable to join that squad; injuries also kept him out of the 2006 FIFA World Cup squad.
