= Mamadou Seck (footballer) =

Senegalese footballer (born 1979)

Personal information
- Full name: Mamadou Seck
- Date of birth: 23 August 1979 (age 47)
- Place of birth: Rufisque, Senegal
- Height: 6 ft 4 in (1.93 m)
- Position: Defender

Senior career*
Years	Team	Apps	(Gls)
1998–2000	Toulouse	0	(0)
2000–2002	Nimes	38	(0)
2002–2005	Ajaccio	73	(4)
2005–2006	Erciyesspor	8	(0)
2006–2007	Le Havre	11	(0)
2007–2008	Sheffield United	0	(0)
2008	→ Scunthorpe United (loan)	1	(0)
Total		121	(4)

International career
2003–2005	Senegal	6	(0)
- * Club domestic league appearances and goals

Mamadou Seck (born 23 August 1979) is a Senegalese former professional footballer who played as a defender.

== Club career ==
Born in Rufisque, Seck started his career as a youth in August 1998 for Toulouse and was signed by Nîmes Olympique at the beginning of the 2000–01 season. He played 28 games in two seasons before signing for AC Ajaccio for whom he played 73 times, scoring four goals until signing for Kayseri Erciyesspor for the 2005–06 season. He played only eight times for the Turkish side, moving to Le Havre AC in January 2006, playing 11 times during his 12-month stay before being released on a free transfer to Sheffield United.

Seck signed a 2 1/2-year deal with Sheffield United on 16 January 2007 and made his Blades debut the same day, in a friendly at Bramall Lane against the Chengdu Blades. The game ended 1–1 with Seck playing 58 minutes. However, the Senegal international found first team opportunities limited in the Premier League season.

In January 2008 he was loaned out for a month to Championship side Scunthorpe United but made only one substitute appearance. Seck was released by Sheffield United at the end of the 2007–08 season.

== International career ==
Seck played six times for Senegal national team.

== Personal life ==
He holds both Senegalese and French nationalities.
