= Colin Marrison =

English footballer

Personal information
- Full name: Colin Ian Marrison
- Date of birth: 23 September 1985 (age 41)
- Place of birth: Sheffield, England
- Height: 6 ft 1 in (1.85 m)
- Position: Striker

Youth career
- Sheffield United

Senior career*
Years	Team	Apps	(Gls)
2005–2007	Sheffield United	0	(0)
2005	→ Hinckley United (loan)	16	(7)
2005	→ Leigh RMI (loan)	?	(?)
2006	→ Bury (loan)	16	(0)
2007	→ Hinckley United (loan)	11	(6)
2007–2008	Hinckley United	35	(13)
2008	Tamworth	12	(5)
2008–2009	Gainsborough Trinity		
2009	→ Retford United (loan)		
2009–2010	Retford United		
2010	Matlock Town		
2010–2011	Stocksbridge Park Steels		
2011–2014	Belper Town		
2014–2016	Handsworth Parramore		
- * Club domestic league appearances and goals as of 20:00, 11 January 2007 (UTC)

Colin Ian Marrison (born 23 September 1985) is an English former professional footballer.

Marrison was a striker who notably played in the Football League for Bury, whilst on loan from Sheffield United. He also played at Non-League level for Hinckley United, Leigh RMI, Tamworth, Gainsborough Trinity, Retford United, Matlock Town, Stocksbridge Park Steels, Belper Town and Handsworth Parramore.

== Playing career ==
Marrison is a powerfully built but mobile centre-forward. He made two appearances for Sheffield United in season 2005–06, both in the League Cup against Shrewsbury Town and Reading respectively.

He went out on loan to Bury on 12 January 2006 where he made 16 Football League Two appearances for the Shakers.

Marrison has also had loan spells at non-League sides Leigh RMI and Hinckley United.

In season 2006–07, he has been a regular in United's Reserves 'B'. He has made one appearance for the first team as a substitute in a League Cup tie with Bury at Bramall Lane on 19 September 2006.

In March 2007, he joined Conference North side Hinckley United on loan until the end of the season. He has now joined Hinckley United on a permanent one-year contract after being released by Sheffield United shortly after Neil Warnock's departure.

He signed for Tamworth in January 2008 where he went on to score five goals in 12 starts for the Lambs, before signing for Gainsborough Trinity.

In March 2009, Marrison went on loan from Gainsborough Trinity to Northern Premier League side Retford United where he made a scoring debut against Spalding United on 28 March, then followed that up with another goal in his second game, again playing against Spalding United on 31 March.

In July 2009, Marrison signed for Retford United on a permanent basis.

In June 2010, he moved from Retford to fellow Northern Premier League side Matlock Town. Marrison later played for Belper Town and Handsworth Parramore where he left in 2016.
