= Ian Bennett (footballer) =

English footballer (born 1971)

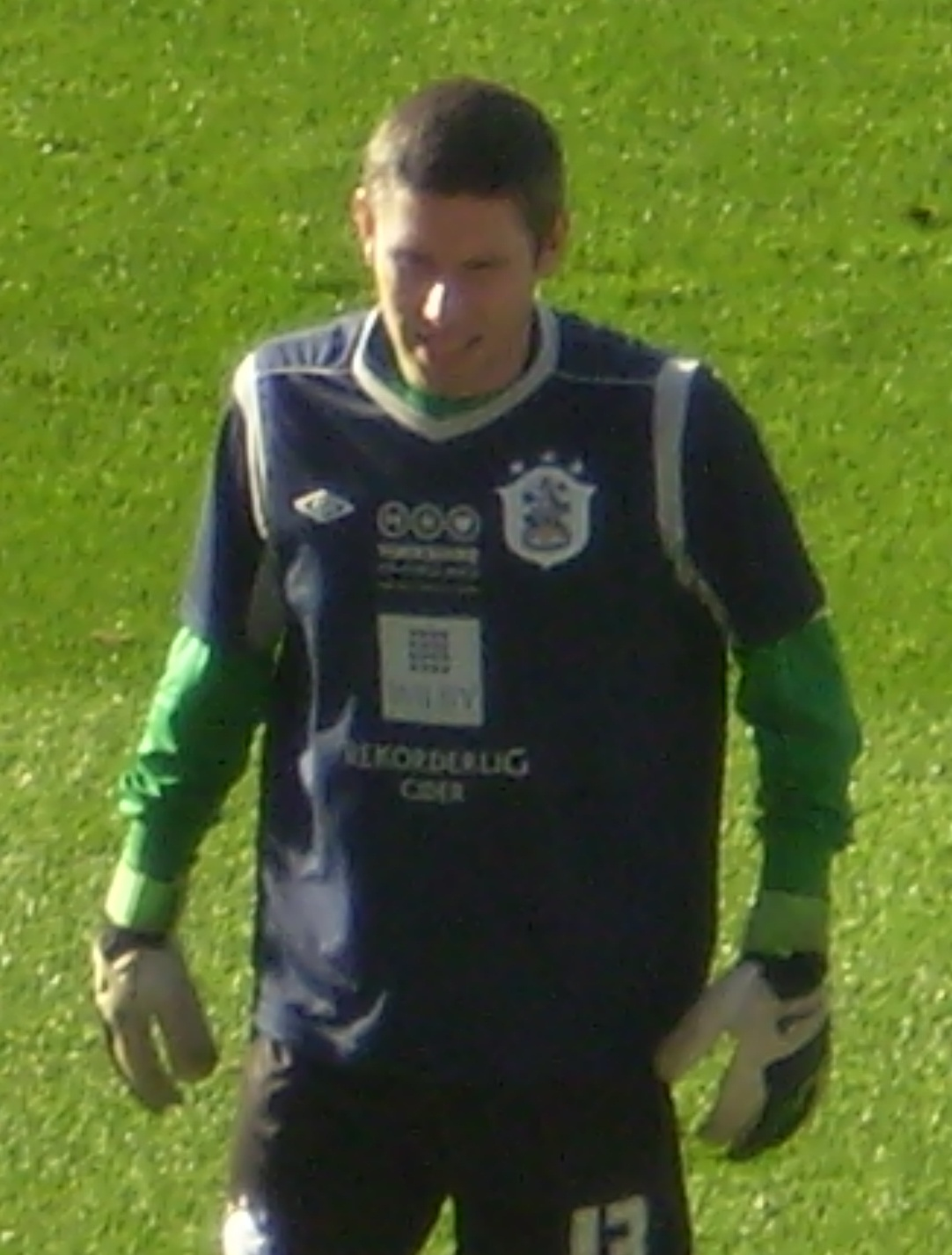
- Bennett warming up in October 2012

Personal information
- Full name: Ian Michael Bennett
- Date of birth: 10 October 1971 (age 55)
- Place of birth: Worksop, England
- Height: 6 ft 0 in (1.83 m)
- Position: Goalkeeper

Team information
- Current team: Huddersfield Town (goalkeeping coach)

Youth career
- 1988–1989: Queens Park Rangers

Senior career*
Years	Team	Apps	(Gls)
1989–1991	Newcastle United	0	(0)
1991–1993	Peterborough United	72	(0)
1993–2005	Birmingham City	287	(0)
2004–2005	→ Sheffield United (loan)	5	(0)
2005	→ Coventry City (loan)	6	(0)
2005–2006	Leeds United	4	(0)
2006–2010	Sheffield United	16	(0)
2010–2014	Huddersfield Town	58	(0)
Total		448	(0)
- * Club domestic league appearances and goals

Ian Michael Bennett (born 10 October 1971) is an English former footballer who played as a goalkeeper from 1989 to 2014, most notably representing Birmingham City between 1993 and 2005. He is the goalkeeping coach at Huddersfield Town.

== Early life ==
Ian Michael Bennett was born on 10 October 1971 in Worksop, Nottinghamshire.

== Playing career ==
=== QPR and Newcastle ===
Bennett started his football career as a YTS trainee with Queens Park Rangers in 1988. He turned professional with Newcastle United in March of the same season. Bennett never made a single first-team appearance for either club, and signed for Peterborough United in March 1991.

=== Peterborough United ===
Bennett signed for Peterborough United in March 1991. He made 89 appearances for the Posh (72 in the League) as they gained successive promotions from the old Fourth and Third Divisions between 1991 and 1993. After two seasons in the then First Division, Bennett moved on.

=== Birmingham City ===
Barry Fry signed Bennett for Birmingham City for £325,000 in December 1993. He became the first-choice goalkeeper, was ever-present as the club won the 1994–95 Second Division (third-tier) title, and remained as first choice for the next five years before losing his place to Kevin Poole in September 1998 because of injury. A broken finger in 1999–2000 pre-season extended his absence, but he returned to the team in October for a League Cup match at home to Newcastle United. With his first touch, he saved a penalty kick taken by Alan Shearer and Birmingham went on to win 2–0. He spoke after the match about his frustration with the injuries and his desire for first-team football, preferably with Birmingham. He kept his place for a few weeks before being dropped because of his contractual dispute with the club, but signed a new deal in January 2000 and returned to the side, continuing as first choice until a broken thumb ruled him out for the last two months of the season. With Poole also injured, loanee Thomas Myhre completed the campaign. Undisputed first choice the following season, Bennett helped Birmingham reach the 2001 League Cup Final, in which he made some fine saves in a losing cause as Liverpool won on penalties.

Although the signings of Nico Vaesen in summer 2001 and Maik Taylor two years later meant that Bennett was not selected as often as he wanted, he still made his 350th Birmingham appearance in October 2003, keeping a clean sheet against Aston Villa.

In late 2004 he was loaned to Sheffield United where he impressed manager Neil Warnock in the five games he played as cover for the injured Paddy Kenny. After this he was loaned to Coventry City. During his loan spell, his dismissal in the goalless draw to home to Stoke City made him the only Coventry goalkeeper to be sent off in a competitive match at Highfield Road.

=== Leeds United ===
On 17 June 2005, after 12 years at Birmingham, Bennett transferred to Leeds United who already had Scottish international Neil Sullivan as first-choice goalkeeper. Despite playing the pre-season friendlies, he was limited to four league appearances during the 2005–06 season, obtained deputising for the injured Sullivan.

=== Sheffield United ===
In July 2006, Bennett transferred for an undisclosed fee to newly promoted Premiership club Sheffield United, signing on a two-year deal to provide competition to the Blades' first-choice goalkeeper, Paddy Kenny. He played the first game of his second spell at the club at Bramall Lane against Reading on 16 September 2006. Bennett found first-team chances difficult to come by thanks to the fitness and form of Kenny; he made only nine starts in his first two seasons at Bramall Lane. His contract expired at the end of the 2007–08 season but despite reported interest from other clubs he signed a new one-year deal.

The following season again saw his first team opportunities limited to only two league starts and appearances in cup competitions. Nevertheless, the club took up their option to extend his contract for a further year.

=== Huddersfield Town ===
On 17 June 2010, after leaving Sheffield United, he was signed by Football League One club Huddersfield Town, reuniting with Gary Naysmith and manager Lee Clark with whom he worked at Newcastle United.

Bennett made his debut in the second round of the League Cup against Everton at Goodison Park, as a replacement for first-choice goalkeeper Alex Smithies. His first start for the Terriers was on 5 October, in the Football League Trophy match at the Galpharm Stadium against Peterborough United, which Town won 3–2. His first league start came four days later in the 3–0 win over Colchester United.

He played more than expected due to injuries to Smithies. In a 2–0 win over Carlisle United on 1 February 2011, Bennett twice made saves from François Zoko. After the match, Carlisle United manager Greg Abbott praised Bennett performance and said: "They were wonder saves and saves change games. If one of those had gone in it would have been different." On 18 May, he saved a penalty in the League One play-off semi-final penalty shootout against Bournemouth, which Huddersfield went on to win 4–2. The following season he saved two penalties in Town's 2–2 away draw with Scunthorpe United on 25 October 2011. At the end of the season, Bennett signed a new two-year contract which would see him stay on until the age of 42.

=== Coaching career ===
Bennett's playing contract expired in May 2014. However, after Nick Colgan was appointed as senior goalkeeping coach, Bennett was appointed to Colgan's previous role as goalkeeping coach for the Huddersfield Town academy.

A year later, Bennett left the Yorkshire club after five years in order to take up an Academy coaching role at Nottingham Forest. Ahead of the 2020–21 season, he moved on to Middlesbrough to join Neil Warnock's staff as goalkeeping coach.

== Honours ==
Birmingham City

- Football League First Division play-offs: 2002
- Football League Second Division: 1994–95
- Football League Trophy: 1994–95
- Football League Cup runner-up: 2000–01

Individual

- PFA Team of the Year: 1994–95 Second Division
