= Ryan Gyaki =

Canadian soccer player

Personal information
- Date of birth: 6 December 1985 (age 40)
- Place of birth: Toronto, Ontario, Canada
- Height: 1.78 m (5 ft 10 in)
- Position: Attacking midfielder

Youth career
- 2000–2002: Calgary Storm
- 2003–2005: Sheffield United

Senior career*
Years	Team	Apps	(Gls)
2005–2007	Sheffield United	0	(0)
2007–2009	Hansa Rostock II	9	(0)

International career^{‡}
2004–2005	Canada U20	17	(4)
2008	Canada U23	3	(0)
- * Club domestic league appearances and goals as of 22 November 2007 ‡ National team caps and goals as of 24 June 2008

Ryan Gyaki (born 6 December 1985) is a Canadian former professional soccer player and professional soccer coach. He was last signed with FC Hansa Rostock in Germany. Currently, he is the head coach of the Mount Royal University men's soccer team in Calgary, Canada, called The Cougars.

Awarded "Canadian U20 player of the Year" in 2005, Gyaki was a creative midfielder who usually played in a forward playmaking role as an attacking midfielder. He represented the Canada national team in 2005 as captain of the U20 soccer team.

Gyaki, a former standout in the Calgary youth soccer scene, made his transition to the professional ranks at only 17 years old. He played for Sheffield United F.C. in England, before a knee injury sidelined him for the remaining part of the season. The following season, he signed a contract with F.C. Hansa Rostock in the German first Bundesliga.

After continuing knee problems, Gyaki decided to retire his professional career as a player and focus on this coaching career instead. In 2014, Gyaki became assistant coach of the men's soccer team at Mount Royal University and in 2015 he succeeded as head coach. In his first season as manager, Gyaki guided the Mount Royal Cougars to the playoffs for the first time in University history, finishing third in the Prairie Division.

== Career ==
Gyaki started his career with Calgary Storm and was discovered at 17 years old, by Sheffield United in Cuba while touring with a Calgary select team. He signed with Sheffield United F.C. in the English Premier League.

Unfortunately, after just one game with United's reserves in August 2005, he damaged knee ligaments and missed the entire 2005–06 promotion campaign. After five years with the Premiership and Championship outfit, he left United in 2007 and signed with F.C. Hansa Rostock in the German first Bundesliga.

After a continuing battle with knee problems, he was released by FC Hansa Rostock on 27 May 2009.

== International career ==
In 2004–05 season, after recovering from torn abdominal muscles, Gyaki captained the Canadian U20 national team and scored all four of their goals during qualifying for the 2005 FIFA World Youth Championship in the Netherlands. He played 90 minutes in all three of Canada's games in the tournament against Colombia, Syria and Italy. He was named Canada Youth Player of the Year in 2005. Gyaki presented Canada in Seventeen games on Under-20 Level and scores four goals. He was rated as one of the top 10 players to watch at the under 20 world cup in 2005.

== Personal life ==
Gyaki holds an Austrian and a Canadian passport and his girlfriend Vivienne Gliesche was Miss Mecklenburg-Vorpommern 2007. His father is from Burgenland and his mother is from Wien, his grandparents raised in Oberwart in Austria.
