= Leon Osman =

English footballer (born 1981)

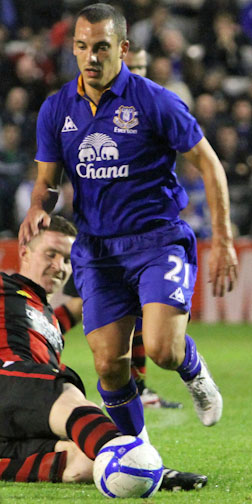
- Osman playing for Everton in 2011

Personal information
- Full name: Leon Osman
- Date of birth: 17 May 1981 (age 45)
- Place of birth: Wigan, England
- Height: 5 ft 8 in (1.73 m)
- Position: Midfielder

Youth career
- 1997–2000: Everton

Senior career*
Years	Team	Apps	(Gls)
2000–2016	Everton	352	(43)
2002–2003	→ Carlisle United (loan)	12	(1)
2004	→ Derby County (loan)	17	(3)
Total		381	(47)

International career
1997–1998	England U16	5	(0)
2012–2013	England	2	(0)
- * Club domestic league appearances and goals

Leon Osman (born 17 May 1981) is an English former professional footballer who played as a midfielder.

A product of the Everton academy, Osman spent almost all of his professional career with the first-team, making his debut for Everton in January 2003. He went on to make 433 appearances for the club, scoring 57 goals. Earlier in his career he spent time on loan at Football League clubs Carlisle United and Derby County, making his senior football debut for the former in October 2002.

Osman earned two international caps for the England national team, making his debut at the age of 31.

== Early life ==
Osman was born in Wigan, Greater Manchester, to a Turkish Cypriot father and a British mother, and raised in Skelmersdale, Lancashire. He attended Up Holland High School and Winstanley College. He is also of Somali descent through his paternal grandfather.

== Club career ==
=== Early career and loans ===
Osman joined the Everton Academy as a boy, and was part of the team that won the 1998 FA Youth Cup. Following the cup victory, he sustained a knee injury which kept him from playing for a year.

He was loaned to Carlisle United of the Third Division in October 2002, making his first-team debut on the 5th by playing the full 90 minutes of a 2–1 home defeat to Torquay United. He scored once for the team in a league fixture against Macclesfield Town on 19 October to ensure a 2–2 draw at Moss Rose, and twice against Oldham Athletic in the Football League Trophy three days later in a 4–3 away victory. On returning to Everton in January, he made his Premier League debut in a 4–3 defeat at Tottenham Hotspur on 12 January 2003, replacing Li Tie in added time. His only other Everton appearance of the season was his Goodison Park debut on 26 April, replacing Steve Watson at the end of a 2–1 win over Aston Villa.

Osman was granted a one-year extension to his Everton contract in the summer of 2003, but failed to break into the first team until the end of the 2003–04 season. Instead, he was again loaned out, this time to Derby County in the First Division. He had an integral role in Derby's successful bid to avoid relegation, and manager George Burley tried to buy him from Everton. Instead, Osman returned to his parent club with three matches remaining in Everton's season. Manager David Moyes gave Osman his first start on 1 May 2004 at Wolverhampton Wanderers, and he headed Everton into the lead within three minutes from a James McFadden cross, although they eventually lost 2–1.

=== First-team breakthrough ===
Osman became a first-team regular in 2004–05, playing on the right wing of a 4–1–4–1 formation. He finished the season with seven goals including two in a match against Aston Villa. In the 2005–06 season, Osman's place in the Everton's first team was challenged by the new signing Simon Davies. However, Osman was able to establish himself as a first-team regular by 2006–07, a season in which made 37 appearances and scored three goals.

His start to the 2007–08 season began with two goals in consecutive wins against Wigan Athletic and Tottenham Hotspur. His appearance in the starting 11 for Everton was threatened by the arrival of South African loan-signing Steven Pienaar. Osman scored his first goal in a UEFA competition on 25 October 2007, Everton's second in a 3–1 UEFA Cup group stage win over Greek club Larissa at Goodison Park. His shot from 22 yards helped Everton to the top of the group and was voted Everton's Goal of the Season. Osman scored both goals in Everton's 2–0 win over Fulham on the final day of the season to secure Everton 5th place in the Premier League for 2008–09. At the end of the season, he started in the 2009 FA Cup Final at Wembley Stadium, being replaced by Dan Gosling in the 82nd minute of the 2–1 defeat to Chelsea.

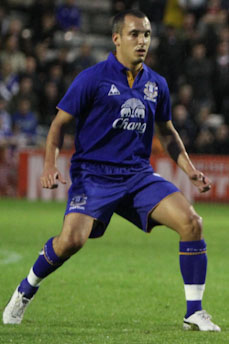
Osman playing for Everton in 2011

The following season Osman captained Everton for the first time in a League Cup match away to Hull City scoring once in the 4–0 victory. In April 2010, Osman was named man of the match in two consecutive matches. He also ended the 2010–11 Premier League season with four goals.

In March 2013, in a match against reigning champions Manchester City, Osman made his 300th Everton start. A long-range goal scored in the match was his eighth of the season, a personal record, and his 50th goal for the club. In December, Osman also scored on his 300th Premier League appearance during a 4–1 win over Fulham. Later in the same month he broke David Unsworth's Everton Premier League appearance record, reaching 303 appearances. He featured in every league match in the 2013–14 season, the first under manager Roberto Martínez, the only Everton player to do so. To mark his long service, a testimonial match against FC Porto was held as part of Everton's pre-season schedule for the 2014–15 season.

On 6 November 2014, he signed a one-year contract extension to keep him at Everton until the summer of 2016. Later that day, he opened the scoring in Everton's 3–0 UEFA Europa League group stage win against Lille. He scored on his 400th appearance for the club, netting the winner in a 2–1 victory over West Ham United His contract expired at the end of 2015–16, and Osman was released by Everton. He retired from playing soon after.

== International career ==
Osman represented England at U16 level in the 1997–98 season. On 14 November 2012, at the age of 31, Osman earned his first senior call-up to the England squad for a friendly fixture against Sweden. Osman started in central midfield for his country in a 4–2 defeat against Sweden, in which he played the full 90 minutes. On 31 January 2013, Osman was named in the England squad for the second time for the friendly fixture against Brazil on 6 February 2013, though he was left on the substitutes' bench for the match. Osman received his first competitive international call up after being named in the England squad on 14 March 2013 for the World Cup qualifiers against San Marino and Montenegro. Osman made his competitive England debut against San Marino.

== After football ==
Since retiring from football Osman has been a pundit for Sky Sports News, BT Sport, Amazon Prime and BBC Radio Five Live.

== Career statistics ==
=== Club ===
Appearances and goals by club, season and competition
Club	Season	League			FA Cup		League Cup		Other		Total	
Club	Season	Division	Apps	Goals	Apps	Goals	Apps	Goals	Apps	Goals	Apps	Goals
Everton	2000–01	Premier League	0	0	0	0	0	0	—		0	0
Everton	2001–02	Premier League	0	0	0	0	0	0	—		0	0
Everton	2002–03	Premier League	2	0	—		0	0	—		2	0
Everton	2003–04	Premier League	4	1	0	0	1	0	—		5	1
Everton	2004–05	Premier League	29	6	3	1	3	0	—		35	7
Everton	2005–06	Premier League	35	3	4	1	1	0	2 (Note: One appearance in UEFA Champions League, one in UEFA Cup)	0	42	4
Everton	2006–07	Premier League	34	3	1	0	2	0	—		37	3
Everton	2007–08	Premier League	28	4	0	0	4	1	7 (Note: Appearances in UEFA Cup)	2	39	7
Everton	2008–09	Premier League	34	6	6	1	1	0	2	0	43	7
Everton	2009–10	Premier League	26	2	1	1	1	1	7 (Note: Appearances in UEFA Europa League)	0	35	4
Everton	2010–11	Premier League	26	4	3	0	2	1	—		31	5
Everton	2011–12	Premier League	30	4 (Note: The Premier League credits Osman with five goals in 2011–12, including one against West Bromwich Albion that other sources attribute to a Gareth McAuley own goal.)	3	0	1	0	—		34	4
Everton	2012–13	Premier League	36	5	5	2	1	1	—		42	8
Everton	2013–14	Premier League	38	3	4	0	1	0	—		43	3
Everton	2014–15	Premier League	21	2	0	0	1	0	7	1	29	3
Everton	2015–16	Premier League	9	0	2	0	5	1	—		16	1
Everton	Total		352	43	32	6	24	5	25	3	433	57
Carlisle United (loan)	2002–03	Third Division	12	1	—		—		3 (Note: Appearances in Football League Trophy)	2	15	3
Derby County (loan)	2003–04	First Division	17	3	—		—		—		17	3
Career total			381	47	32	6	24	5	28	5	465	63

=== International ===
Appearances and goals by national team and year
National team	Year	Apps	Goals
England	2012	1	0
England	2013	1	0
Total		2	0

== Honours ==
Everton Youth

- FA Youth Cup: 1997–98

Everton

- FA Cup runner-up: 2008–09

Individual

- Everton Goal of the Season: 2007–08
