= 2007–08 Everton F.C. season =

English football club season

Everton
2007–08 season
- Chairman: Bill Kenwright
- Manager: David Moyes
- Premier League: 5th
- FA Cup: Third round
- League Cup: Semi-finals
- UEFA Cup: Round of 16
- Top goalscorer: League: Yakubu (15); All: Yakubu (21)
- Highest home attendance: 40,049 (vs. Liverpool, 20 October)
- Lowest home attendance: 31,885 (vs. Middlesbrough, 30 September)
Home colours	Away colours

The 2007–08 Everton F.C. season was Everton's 16th season in the Premier League, and their 54th consecutive season in the top division of English football.

== Season summary ==
After a sluggish start, Everton climbed the table and stood fourth with ten games left to play. Unfortunately, Everton only won three of these ten games and finished the season in fifth, with 65 points. In many other seasons this would have been good enough to clinch fourth place and Champions League qualification - indeed, Everton finished with more points than they had in 2004–05, when they had finished fourth - but, due to the good form of arch-rivals Liverpool, Everton were forced into fifth, consigning them to UEFA Cup football. Nonetheless, this was a great result for a club with limited financial resources, and served to enhance manager David Moyes' reputation as one of the best managers in England.

== Final league table ==
Pos	Team	Pld	W	D	L	GF	GA	GD	Pts	Qualification or relegation
3	Arsenal	38	24	11	3	74	31	+43	83	Qualification for the Champions League third qualifying round
4	Liverpool	38	21	13	4	67	28	+39	76	Qualification for the Champions League third qualifying round
5	Everton	38	19	8	11	55	33	+22	65	Qualification for the UEFA Cup first round
6	Aston Villa	38	16	12	10	71	51	+20	60	Qualification for the Intertoto Cup third round
7	Blackburn Rovers	38	15	13	10	50	48	+2	58	

Source: Barclays Premier League
Rules for classification: 1) points; 2) goal difference; 3) number of goals scored.
For further information on European qualification see Premier League – Competition

== Squad ==
Squad at end of season

Note: Flags indicate national team as defined under FIFA eligibility rules; some limited exceptions apply. Players may hold more than one non-FIFA nationality.

No.	Pos.	Nation	Player
2	DF	ENG	Tony Hibbert
3	DF	ENG	Leighton Baines
4	DF	NGR	Joseph Yobo (vice-captain)
5	DF	ENG	Joleon Lescott
6	MF	ESP	Mikel Arteta
7	MF	NED	Andy van der Meyde
8	FW	ENG	Andrew Johnson
10	MF	DEN	Thomas Gravesen (on loan from Celtic)
12	GK	SCO	Iain Turner
14	FW	ENG	James Vaughan
15	DF	ENG	Anthony Gardner (on loan from Tottenham Hotspur)
16	DF	ENG	Phil Jagielka
17	MF	AUS	Tim Cahill
18	MF	ENG	Phil Neville (captain)

No.	Pos.	Nation	Player
19	DF	POR	Nuno Valente
20	MF	RSA	Steven Pienaar
21	MF	ENG	Leon Osman
22	FW	NGR	Yakubu
23	MF	POR	Manuel Fernandes (on loan from Valencia)
24	GK	USA	Tim Howard
26	MF	IRL	Lee Carsley
28	FW	NGR	Victor Anichebe
29	DF	SCO	Patrick Boyle
30	GK	ENG	John Ruddy
32	DF	ENG	Dan Gosling
33	GK	GER	Stefan Wessels
34	DF	ENG	John Irving
37	DF	ENG	Jack Rodwell

=== Left club during season ===
Note: Flags indicate national team as defined under FIFA eligibility rules; some limited exceptions apply. Players may hold more than one non-FIFA nationality.

No.	Pos.	Nation	Player
11	FW	SCO	James McFadden (to Birmingham City)
15	DF	ENG	Alan Stubbs (to Derby County)
25	MF	BRA	Anderson da Silva (to Barnsley)
27	FW	ENG	Lukas Jutkiewicz (on loan to Plymouth Argyle)
29	DF	SCO	Patrick Boyle (on loan to Crewe Alexandra)

No.	Pos.	Nation	Player
30	GK	ENG	John Ruddy (on loan to Stockport County)
31	MF	ISL	Bjarni Viðarsson (on loan to FC Twente)
36	MF	ENG	John Paul Kissock (on loan to Gretna)
38	FW	ENG	Stephen Connor (on loan to Partick Thistle)
—	FW	ENG	Scott Spencer (on loan to Macclesfield Town)

=== Player awards ===
- Player of the Season - Joleon Lescott
- Players' Player of the Season - Joleon Lescott
- Young Player of the Season - Victor Anichebe
- Reserve / U21 Player of the Season - John Irving
- Academy Player of the Season - Jack Rodwell
- Goal of the Season - Leon Osman vs. AEL

== Transfers ==
=== In ===
Date	Pos.	Name	From	Fee	Ref
17 March 2007	FW	(England) Lukas Jutkiewicz	(England) Swindon Town	Undisclosed	
4 July 2007	DF	(England) Phil Jagielka	(England) Sheffield United	£4m	
7 August 2007	DF	(England) Leighton Baines	(England) Wigan Athletic	£5m	
21 August 2007	GK	(Germany) Stefan Wessels	(Germany) 1. FC Köln	Free	
29 August 2007	FW	(Nigeria) Yakubu	(England) Middlesbrough	£11.25m	
14 January 2008	MF	(England) Dan Gosling	(England) Plymouth Argyle	£1m	

=== Out ===
Date	Pos.	Name	To	Fee	Ref
14 May 2007	DF	(Italy) Alessandro Pistone	Released		
14 May 2007	GK	(England) Richard Wright	Released		
5 July 2007	DF	(Scotland) Gary Naysmith	(England) Sheffield United	£1m	
4 August 2007	FW	(England) James Beattie	(England) Sheffield United	£4m	
18 January 2008	FW	(Scotland) James McFadden	(England) Birmingham City	£5m	
31 January 2008	DF	(England) Alan Stubbs	(England) Derby County	Free	
31 January 2008	MF	(Brazil) Anderson de Silva	(England) Barnsley	Undisclosed	

=== Loan in ===
Date from	Date to	Pos.	Name	From	Ref.
24 July 2007	30 June 2008	MF	(South Africa) Steven Pienaar	(Germany) Borussia Dortmund	
30 August 2007	30 June 2008	MF	(Denmark) Thomas Gravesen	(Scotland) Celtic	
12 January 2008	30 June 2008	MF	(Portugal) Manuel Fernandes	(Spain) Valencia	
31 January 2008	30 June 2008	DF	(England) Anthony Gardner	(England) Tottenham Hotspur	

=== Loan out ===
Date from	Date to	Pos.	Name	To	Ref.
3 August 2007	30 January 2008	FW	(England) Stephen Connor	(Scotland) Partick Thistle	
2 January 2008	30 June 2008	FW	(England) Lukas Jutkiewicz	(England) Plymouth Argyle	
7 January 2008	4 February 2008	FW	(England) Scott Spencer	(England) Yeovil Town	
21 January 2008	20 April 2008	DF	(Scotland) Patrick Boyle	(England) Crewe Alexandra	
25 January 2008	30 June 2008	MF	(England) John Paul Kissock	(Scotland) Gretna	
29 January 2008	30 June 2008	MF	(Iceland) Bjarni Viðarsson	(Netherlands) FC Twente	
22 February 2008	30 June 2008	GK	(England) John Ruddy	(England) Stockport County	
7 March 2008	7 April 2008	FW	(England) Scott Spencer	(England) Macclesfield Town	

== Results ==
=== Premier League ===
==== Results by round ====
Round	1	2	3	4	5	6	7	8	9	10	11	12	13	14	15	16	17	18	19	20	21	22	23	24	25	26	27	28	29	30	31	32	33	34	35	36	37	38
Ground	H	A	A	H	A	H	A	H	A	H	A	H	A	H	A	H	A	A	H	H	A	H	A	H	A	H	A	H	A	A	H	A	H	A	H	H	A	H
Result	W	W	L	D	W	L	L	W	L	L	W	W	D	W	D	W	W	L	W	L	W	W	W	D	D	W	W	W	W	L	D	L	W	D	L	D	L	W
Position	6	2	5	7	4	7	8	6	10	10	10	9	9	8	9	7	6	6	6	6	6	5	5	5	5	5	5	5	5	5	5	5	5	5	5	5	5	5

Updated to match(es) played on 11 May 2008 (end of season). Source: worldfootball.net
A = Away; H = Home; W = Win; D = Draw; L = Loss

==== Matches ====
11 August 2007 1	Everton	2–1	Wigan Athletic	Liverpool
	Osman 26'; Anichebe 75'	Report	Sibierski 80'	Stadium: Goodison Park; Attendance: 39,220; Referee: Mark Clattenburg

14 August 2007 2	Tottenham Hotspur	1–3	Everton	Tottenham, London
	Gardner 26'	Report	Lescott 3'; Osman 37'; Stubbs 45'	Stadium: White Hart Lane; Attendance: 35,716; Referee: Mark Halsey

18 August 2007 3	Reading	1–0	Everton	Reading
	Hunt 44'	Report		Stadium: Madejski Stadium; Attendance: 22,813

25 August 2007 4	Everton	1–1	Blackburn Rovers	Liverpool
17:15 BST	McFadden 78'	Report	Santa Cruz 16' Ooijer (yellow card) 6' Pedersen (yellow card) 89'	Stadium: Goodison Park; Attendance: 33,850

1 September 2007 5	Bolton Wanderers	1–2	Everton	Bolton
	Anelka 55'	Report	Yakubu 11'; Lescott 89'	Stadium: Reebok Stadium; Attendance: 22,064; Referee: Peter Walton

15 September 2007 6	Everton	0–1	Manchester United	Liverpool
12:00 BST	Neville (yellow card) 68'; Pienaar (yellow card) 82'	Report	Scholes (yellow card) 43'; Ronaldo (yellow card) 71'; Vidić 83'	Stadium: Goodison Park; Attendance: 39,364; Referee: Alan Wiley

23 September 2007 7	Aston Villa	2–0	Everton	Aston, Birmingham
	Carew 14'; Agbonlahor 61'			Stadium: Villa Park; Attendance: 38,235

30 September 2007 8	Everton	2–0	Middlesbrough	Liverpool
16:00 BST	Lescott 7'; Pienaar 58'	Report	O'Neil (yellow card) 34'; Mido (yellow card) 43'; Dong-Gook (yellow card) 55'	Stadium: Goodison Park; Attendance: 31,885; Referee: Mike Riley

7 October 2007 9	Newcastle United	3–2	Everton	Newcastle-upon-Tyne
	Butt 42'; Emre 86'; Owen 90'	Report	Johnson 53'; Given 90' (o.g.)	Stadium: St James' Park; Attendance: 50,302

20 October 2007 10	Everton	1–2	Liverpool	Liverpool
	Hyypiä 38' (o.g.)		Kuyt 54' (pen.), 90+2' (pen.)	Stadium: Goodison Park; Attendance: 40,049

28 October 2007 11	Derby County	0–2	Everton	Derby
		Report	Arteta 26'; Yakubu 63'	Stadium: Pride Park Stadium; Attendance: 33,048; Referee: Steve Bennett

3 November 2007 12	Everton	3–1	Birmingham City	Liverpool
	Yakubu 10'; Carsley 90+2'; Vaughan 90+3'	Report	Kapo 80'	Stadium: Goodison Park; Attendance: 35,155; Referee: Mike Riley

11 November 2007 13	Chelsea	1–1	Everton	Fulham, London
	Drogba 70'		Cahill 89'	Stadium: Stamford Bridge; Attendance: 41,683

24 November 2007 14	Everton	7–1	Sunderland	Liverpool
	Yakubu 12', 73'; Cahill 17', 62'; Pienaar 44'; Johnson 80'; Osman 85'	Report	Yorke 45'	Stadium: Goodison Park; Attendance: 38,594; Referee: Phil Dowd

1 December 2007 15	Portsmouth	0–0	Everton	Portsmouth
				Stadium: Fratton Park; Attendance: 20,102

8 December 2007 16	Everton	3–0	Fulham	Liverpool
	Yakubu 51', 61', 79'	Report		Stadium: Goodison Park; Attendance: 32,743; Referee: Steve Bennett

15 December 2007 17	West Ham United	0–2	Everton	Upton Park, London
15:00	Ljungberg (yellow card) 90+1'	Report	Yakubu 45' (yellow card) 85'; Johnson 90+3' (yellow card) 90+4'	Stadium: Upton Park; Attendance: 34,430; Referee: Steve Tanner

23 December 2007 18	Manchester United	2–1	Everton	Old Trafford
12:00	Ronaldo 22', 88' (pen.)	Report	Cahill 27'	Stadium: Old Trafford; Attendance: 75,749; Referee: Howard Webb

26 December 2007 19	Everton	2–0	Bolton Wanderers	Liverpool
	Neville 51'; Cahill 71'	Report		Stadium: Goodison Park; Attendance: 39,918; Referee: Rob Styles

29 December 2007 20	Everton	1–4	Arsenal	Liverpool
	Cahill 19'	Report	Eduardo 47', 58'; Bendtner (red card) 74'; Adebayor 78'; Rosický 90'	Stadium: Goodison Park; Attendance: 39,443; Referee: Martin Atkinson

1 January 2008 21	Middlesbrough	0–2	Everton	Middlesbrough
			Johnson 67'; McFadden 72'	Stadium: Riverside Stadium; Attendance: 27,048

12 January 2008 22	Everton	1–0	Manchester City	Liverpool
	Lescott 31'			Stadium: Goodison Park; Attendance: 38,474

20 January 2008 23	Wigan Athletic	1–2	Everton	Wigan
	Jagielka 53' (o.g.)		Johnson 39'; Lescott 62'	Stadium: JJB Stadium; Attendance: 18,810

30 January 2008 24	Everton	0–0	Tottenham Hotspur	Liverpool
				Stadium: Goodison Park; Attendance: 35,840

2 February 2008 25	Blackburn Rovers	0–0	Everton	Blackburn
				Stadium: Ewood Park; Attendance: 27,964

9 February 2008 26	Everton	1–0	Reading	Liverpool
	Jagielka 62'			Stadium: Goodison Park; Attendance: 36,582

25 February 2008 27	Manchester City	0–2	Everton	Manchester
			Yakubu 30'; Lescott 38'	Stadium: City of Manchester Stadium; Attendance: 41,728

2 March 2008 28	Everton	3–1	Portsmouth	Liverpool
	Yakubu 1', 81'; Cahill 74'		Defoe 28'	Stadium: Goodison Park; Attendance: 33,938

9 March 2008 29	Sunderland	0–1	Everton	Sunderland
			Johnson 55'	Stadium: Stadium of Light; Attendance: 42,565

16 March 2008 30	Fulham	1–0	Everton	Fulham, London
	McBride 67'			Stadium: Craven Cottage; Attendance: 25,262

22 March 2008 31	Everton	1–1	West Ham United	Liverpool
	Yakubu 8'		Ashton 68'	Stadium: Goodison Park; Attendance: 37,430

30 March 2008 32	Liverpool	1–0	Everton	Anfield, Liverpool
	Torres 7'	Report		Stadium: Anfield; Attendance: 44,295

6 April 2008 33	Everton	1–0	Derby County	Liverpool
	Osman 56'			Stadium: Goodison Park; Attendance: 36,017

12 April 2008 34	Birmingham City	1–1	Everton	Bordesley, Birmingham
	Zárate 83'		Lescott 78'	Stadium: St Andrew's; Attendance: 25,923

17 April 2008 35	Everton	0–1	Chelsea	Liverpool
			Essien 41'	Stadium: Goodison Park; Attendance: 37,112

27 April 2008 36	Everton	2–2	Aston Villa	Liverpool
	Neville 55'; Yobo 84'		Agbonlahor 80'; Carew 85'	Stadium: Goodison Park; Attendance: 37,936

4 May 2008 37	Arsenal	1–0	Everton	Holloway, London
	Bendtner 76'		Lescott (yellow card) 28'	Stadium: Emirates Stadium; Attendance: 60,123

11 May 2008 38	Everton	3–1	Newcastle United	Liverpool
	Yakubu 28', 82' (pen.); Lescott 70'		Owen 46' (pen.)	Stadium: Goodison Park; Attendance: 39,592

=== UEFA Cup ===
==== First round ====
20 September 2007	Everton (England)	1–1	(Ukraine) Metalist Kharkiv	Liverpool, Merseyside
21:00 CET	Lescott 24'	Report	Edmar 78'	Stadium: Goodison Park; Attendance: 37,210; Referee: Fritz Stuchlik (Austria)

4 October 2007	Metalist Kharkiv (Ukraine)	2–3	(England) Everton	Kharkiv, Kharkiv Oblast
20:45 CET	Edmar 21'; Mahdoufi 52'	(Report)	Lescott 48'; McFadden 72'; Anichebe 88'	Stadium: Metalist Stadium; Attendance: 25,000; Referee: Jouni Hyytiä (Finland)

==== Group stage ====
Pos	Team	Pld	W	D	L	GF	GA	GD	Pts	Qualification	EVE	NÜR	ZEN	AZ	AEL
1	(England) Everton	4	4	0	0	9	3	+6	12	Advance to knockout stage	—	—	1–0	—	3–1
2	(Germany) 1. FC Nürnberg	4	2	1	1	7	6	+1	7	Advance to knockout stage	0–2	—	—	2–1	—
3	(Russia) Zenit Saint Petersburg	4	1	2	1	6	6	0	5	Advance to knockout stage	—	2–2	—	1–1	—
4	(Netherlands) AZ	4	1	1	2	5	6	−1	4		2–3	—	—	—	1–0
5	(Greece) AEL Larissa	4	0	0	4	4	10	−6	0		—	1–3	2–3	—	—

25 October 2007	Everton (England)	3–1	(Greece) AEL	Liverpool, Merseyside
21:00 CET	Cahill 14'; Osman 50'; Anichebe 85'	Report	Cleyton 65'	Stadium: Goodison Park; Attendance: 33,777; Referee: Martin Ingvarsson (Sweden)

8 November 2007	Nürnberg (Germany)	0–2	(England) Everton	Nuremberg, Bavaria
21:05 CET		Report	Arteta 83' (pen.); Anichebe 88'	Stadium: Frankenstadion; Attendance: 43,000; Referee: Alberto Undiano Mallenco (Spain)

5 December 2007	Everton (England)	1–0	(Russia) Zenit St. Peterburg	Liverpool, Merseyside
20:45 CET	Cahill 85'	Report		Stadium: Goodison Park; Attendance: 38,407; Referee: Kristinn Jakobsson (Iceland)

20 December 2007	AZ Alkmaar (Netherlands)	2–3	(England) Everton	Alkmaar, North Holland
20:45 CET	Pellé 16'; Jaliens 65'	Report	Johnson 2'; Jagielka 43'; Vaughan 79'	Stadium: DSB Stadion; Attendance: 16,578; Referee: Selçuk Dereli (Turkey)

==== Round of 32 ====
13 February 2008	Brann (Norway)	0–2	(England) Everton	Bergen, Hordaland
20:00 CET		Report	Osman 59'; Anichebe 88'	Stadium: Brann Stadion; Attendance: 16,207; Referee: Anton Genov (Bulgaria)

21 February 2008	Everton (England)	6–1	(Norway) Brann	Liverpool, Merseyside
21:00 CET	Yakubu 35', 54', 72'; Johnson 41', 90+2'; Arteta 70'	Report	Vaagan Moen 60'	Stadium: Goodison Park; Attendance: 32,834; Referee: Nikolai Ivanov (Russia)

Everton won 8–1 on aggregate.

==== Round of 16 ====
6 March 2008	Fiorentina (Italy)	2–0	(England) Everton	Florence, Tuscany
20:45 CET	Kuzmanović 70'; Montolivo 81'	Report		Stadium: Stadio Artemio Franchi; Attendance: 32,934; Referee: Paul Allaerts (Belgium)

12 March 2008	Everton (England)	2–0 (a.e.t.) (2–4 p)	(Italy) Fiorentina	Liverpool, Merseyside
20:45	Johnson 16'; Arteta 67'	Report		Stadium: Goodison Park; Attendance: 38,026; Referee: Eric Braamhaar (Netherlands)
	Penalties
	Gravesen (penalty scored); Yakubu (penalty missed); Arteta (penalty scored); Jagielka (penalty missed)		(penalty scored) Pazzini; (penalty scored) Montolivo; (penalty scored) Osvaldo; (penalty scored) Santana

Fiorentina 2–2 Everton on aggregate. Fiorentina won 4–2 on penalties.

=== FA Cup ===
5 January 2008 Third round	Everton	0–1	Oldham Athletic	Goodison Park, Liverpool
15:30		Report	McDonald	Attendance: 33,086; Referee: Uriah Rennie

Kick-off delayed by 30 minutes to 3.30pm due to a fire outside the ground.

== League Cup ==
26 September 2007 Third round	Sheffield Wednesday	0–3	Everton	Hillsborough, Sheffield
	McFadden 59', 84'; Yakubu 85'			Attendance: 16,463; Referee: Rob Styles

Fourth round	Luton Town	0–1 (a.e.t.)	Everton	Kenilworth Road, Bedfordshire
			Cahill 100'

Fifth round	West Ham United	1–2	Everton	Boleyn Ground, London
	Cole 12'		Osman 40'; Yakubu 88'	Attendance: 28,777; Referee: Mark Halsey

8 January 2008 Semi-finals 1st leg	Chelsea	2–1	Everton	Stamford Bridge, London
19:45 GMT	Wright-Phillips 25'; Mikel (red card) 54'; Lescott 90+2' (o.g.)		Yakubu 63'	Attendance: 41,178; Referee: Peter Walton

23 January 2008 Semi-finals 2nd leg	Everton	0–1	Chelsea	Goodison Park, Liverpool
19:45 GMT			J. Cole 69'	Attendance: 37,086; Referee: Steve Bennett

== Statistics ==
=== Appearances and goals ===
No.	Pos	Nat	Player	Total		Premier League		FA Cup		League Cup		UEFA Cup	
No.	Pos	Nat	Player	Apps	Goals	Apps	Goals	Apps	Goals	Apps	Goals	Apps	Goals
Goalkeepers
24	GK	(United States) USA	Tim Howard	47	0	36	0	0	0	3	0	8	0
33	GK	(Germany) GER	Stefan Wessels	7	0	2	0	1	0	2	0	2	0
Defenders
2	DF	(England) ENG	Tony Hibbert	35	0	22+2	0	1	0	2	0	4+4	0
3	DF	(England) ENG	Leighton Baines	29	0	13+9	0	1	0	0+1	0	3+2	0
4	DF	(Nigeria) NGR	Joseph Yobo	39	1	29+1	1	0	0	2	0	7	0
5	DF	(England) ENG	Joleon Lescott	54	10	37+1	8	0+1	0	5	0	10	2
16	DF	(England) ENG	Phil Jagielka	49	2	27+7	1	1	0	5	0	7+2	1
19	DF	(Portugal) POR	Nuno Valente	15	0	8+1	0	0	0	3	0	3	0
Midfielders
6	MF	(Spain) ESP	Mikel Arteta	37	4	27+1	1	0	0	2	0	6+1	3
10	MF	(Denmark) DEN	Thomas Gravesen	13	0	1+7	0	1	0	0+1	0	1+2	0
17	MF	(Australia) AUS	Tim Cahill	28	10	18	7	0	0	3+1	1	6	2
18	MF	(England) ENG	Phil Neville	50	2	37	2	0	0	4+1	0	8	0
20	MF	(South Africa) RSA	Steven Pienaar	40	2	25+3	2	1	0	3	0	8	0
21	MF	(England) ENG	Leon Osman	39	7	26+2	4	0	0	4	1	7	2
23	MF	(Portugal) POR	Manuel Fernandes	15	0	9+3	0	0	0	1	0	1+1	0
26	MF	(Republic of Ireland) IRL	Lee Carsley	49	1	33+1	1	1	0	5	0	9	0
37	MF	(England) ENG	Jack Rodwell	3	0	0+2	0	0	0	0	0	0+1	0
Forwards
8	FW	(England) ENG	Andrew Johnson	39	10	20+9	6	1	0	2	0	6+1	4
14	FW	(England) ENG	James Vaughan	13	2	0+8	1	1	0	0+2	0	0+2	1
22	FW	(Nigeria) NGR	Yakubu	40	21	26+3	15	0+1	0	3	3	7	3
28	FW	(Nigeria) NGR	Victor Anichebe	41	5	10+17	1	0+1	0	1+3	0	1+8	4
Players transferred out during the season
11	FW	(Scotland) SCO	James McFadden	21	5	5+7	2	1	0	3	2	5	1
15	DF	(England) ENG	Alan Stubbs	13	1	7+1	1	1	0	2	0	1+1	0
31	MF	(Iceland) ISL	Bjarni Viðarsson	1	0	0	0	0	0	0	0	0+1	0

Last updated: 30 May 2008
Source: Competitions

=== Disciplinary record ===
Disciplinary records for 2007–08 league matches. Players with 1 card or more included only.

No.	Nat.	Player	Yellow cards	Red cards
2	(England)	Tony Hibbert	3	1
3	(England)	Leighton Baines	1	0
5	(England)	Joleon Lescott	3	0
6	(Spain)	Mikel Arteta	2	1
8	(England)	Andrew Johnson	1	0
10	(Denmark)	Thomas Gravesen	1	0
11	(Scotland)	James McFadden	1	0
16	(England)	Phil Jagielka	2	0
17	(Australia)	Tim Cahill	4	0
18	(England)	Phil Neville	6	1
19	(Portugal)	Nuno Valente	1	0
20	(South Africa)	Steven Pienaar	5	0
21	(England)	Leon Osman	1	0
22	(Nigeria)	Yakubu	1	0
24	(United States)	Tim Howard	1	0
26	(Republic of Ireland)	Lee Carsley	6	0
28	(Nigeria)	Victor Anichebe	1	0
