= 2003–04 Everton F.C. season =

English football club season

Everton
2003–04 season
- Chairman: Philip Carter
- Manager: David Moyes
- Stadium: Goodison Park
- Premier League: 17th
- FA Cup: Fourth Round
- League Cup: Fourth Round
- Top goalscorer: League: Wayne Rooney (9 goals); All: Duncan Ferguson; Wayne Rooney (9 each)
- Highest home attendance: 40,228 (vs Newcastle United, 13 September 2003)
- Lowest home attendance: 35,775 (vs Southampton, 19 October 2003)
- Average home league attendance: 38,837

During the 2003–04 English football season, Everton competed in the Premier League (known as the Barclaycard Premiership for sponsorship reasons).

== Season summary ==
In 2002–03, all the talk at Goodison Park was about how David Moyes was restoring some pride to the blue half of Merseyside thanks to a seventh-place finish. 2003–04, however, was quite a different story, as Everton struggled at the wrong end of the Premiership and finished the season one place above the drop zone with 39 points (a tally which in many seasons has seen teams relegated, even under the 38-game format), albeit the abysmal seasons suffered by all of the bottom three clubs meant that Everton rarely looked to be in any serious danger of relegation.

18-year-old striker Wayne Rooney was England's key player in their run to the quarter-finals of Euro 2004, but fast-growing rumours that he was about to be sold to Manchester United put Everton's top flight future under increasing doubt.

== Final league table ==
Pos	Team	Pld	W	D	L	GF	GA	GD	Pts	Qualification or relegation
15	Blackburn Rovers	38	12	8	18	51	59	−8	44	
16	Manchester City	38	9	14	15	55	54	+1	41	
17	Everton	38	9	12	17	45	57	−12	39	
18	Leicester City (R)	38	6	15	17	48	65	−17	33	Relegation to the Football League Championship
19	Leeds United (R)	38	8	9	21	40	79	−39	33	Relegation to the Football League Championship

Source: Premier League
Rules for classification: 1) points; 2) goal difference; 3) number of goals scored.
(R) Relegated

== Results ==
Everton's score comes first

=== Legend ===
Win	Draw	Loss

=== FA Premier League ===
Date	Opponent	Venue	Result	Attendance	Scorers
16 August 2003	Arsenal	A	1–2	38,014	Radzinski
23 August 2003	Fulham	H	3–1	37,604	Naysmith, Unsworth, Watson
26 August 2003	Charlton Athletic	A	2–2	26,336	Watson, Rooney
30 August 2003	Liverpool	H	0–3	40,200	
13 September 2003	Newcastle United	H	2–2	40,228	Radzinski, Ferguson (pen)
21 September 2003	Middlesbrough	A	0–1	28,113	
28 September 2003	Leeds United	H	4–0	39,151	Watson (3), Ferguson
4 October 2003	Tottenham Hotspur	A	0–3	36,137	
19 October 2003	Southampton	H	0–0	35,775	
25 October 2003	Aston Villa	A	0–0	36,146	
1 November 2003	Chelsea	H	0–1	40,189	
10 November 2003	Blackburn Rovers	A	1–2	22,179	Radzinski
22 November 2003	Wolverhampton Wanderers	H	2–0	40,190	Radzinski, Kilbane
29 November 2003	Bolton Wanderers	A	0–2	27,350	
7 December 2003	Manchester City	H	0–0	37,871	
13 December 2003	Portsmouth	A	2–1	20,101	Carsley, Rooney
20 December 2003	Leicester City	H	3–2	37,007	Carsley, Rooney, Radzinski
26 December 2003	Manchester United	A	2–3	67,642	Neville (own goal), Ferguson
28 December 2003	Birmingham City	H	1–0	39,631	Rooney
7 January 2004	Arsenal	H	1–1	38,726	Radzinski
10 January 2004	Fulham	A	1–2	17,103	Kilbane
17 January 2004	Charlton Athletic	H	0–1	36,322	
31 January 2004	Liverpool	A	0–0	44,056	
7 February 2004	Manchester United	H	3–4	40,190	Unsworth, O'Shea (own goal), Kilbane
11 February 2004	Birmingham City	A	0–3	29,004	
21 February 2004	Southampton	A	3–3	31,875	Rooney (2), Ferguson
28 February 2004	Aston Villa	H	2–0	39,353	Radzinski, Gravesen
13 March 2004	Portsmouth	H	1–0	40,105	Rooney
20 March 2004	Leicester City	A	1–1	31,650	Rooney
27 March 2004	Middlesbrough	H	1–1	38,210	Radzinski
3 April 2004	Newcastle United	A	2–4	52,155	Gravesen, Yobo
9 April 2004	Tottenham Hotspur	H	3–1	38,086	Unsworth, Naysmith, Yobo
13 April 2004	Leeds United	A	1–1	39,835	Rooney
17 April 2004	Chelsea	A	0–0	41,169	
24 April 2004	Blackburn Rovers	H	0–1	38,884	
1 May 2004	Wolverhampton Wanderers	A	1–2	29,395	Osman
8 May 2004	Bolton Wanderers	H	1–2	40,190	Ferguson
15 May 2004	Manchester City	A	1–5	47,284	Campbell

=== FA Cup ===
Round	Date	Opponent	Venue	Result	Attendance	Goalscorers
R3	3 January 2004	Norwich City	H	3–1	29,955	Kilbane, Ferguson (2 pens)
R4	25 January 2004	Fulham	H	1–1	27,862	Jeffers
R4R	4 February 2004	Fulham	A	1–2	11,551	Jeffers

=== League Cup ===
Round	Date	Opponent	Venue	Result	Attendance	Goalscorers
R2	24 September 2003	Stockport County	H	3–0	19,807	Ferguson (2, 1 pen), Chadwick
R3	29 October 2003	Charlton Athletic	H	1–0	24,863	Linderoth
R4	3 December 2003	Middlesbrough	A	0–0 (lost 4–5 on pens)	18,568	

== First-team squad ==
Note: Flags indicate national team as defined under FIFA eligibility rules; some limited exceptions apply. Players may hold more than one non-FIFA nationality.

No.	Pos.	Nation	Player
1	GK	(England) ENG	Richard Wright
2	DF	(England) ENG	Steve Watson
3	DF	(Italy) ITA	Alessandro Pistone
4	DF	(England) ENG	Alan Stubbs
5	DF	(Scotland) SCO	David Weir
6	DF	(England) ENG	David Unsworth
8	FW	(Canada) CAN	Tomasz Radzinski (Note: Radzinski was born in Poland.)
9	FW	(England) ENG	Kevin Campbell
10	FW	(Scotland) SCO	Duncan Ferguson
11	FW	(England) ENG	Francis Jeffers (on loan from Arsenal)
12	MF	(China) CHN	Li Tie
13	GK	(England) ENG	Steve Simonsen
14	MF	(Republic of Ireland) IRL	Kevin Kilbane (Note: Kilbane was born in Preston, England.)
15	DF	(Scotland) SCO	Gary Naysmith

No.	Pos.	Nation	Player
16	MF	(Denmark) DEN	Thomas Gravesen
17	MF	(Scotland) SCO	Scot Gemmill
18	FW	(England) ENG	Wayne Rooney
20	DF	(Nigeria) NGA	Joseph Yobo
21	MF	(Ghana) GHA	Alex Nyarko
22	MF	(Sweden) SWE	Tobias Linderoth
24	FW	(Scotland) SCO	James McFadden
25	GK	(England) ENG	Nigel Martyn
26	MF	(Republic of Ireland) IRL	Lee Carsley (Note: Carsley was born in England.)
27	DF	(England) ENG	Peter Clarke
28	DF	(England) ENG	Tony Hibbert
30	FW	(England) ENG	Nick Chadwick
31	MF	(England) ENG	Leon Osman
35	GK	(England) ENG	Paul Gerrard

=== Left club during season ===
Note: Flags indicate national team as defined under FIFA eligibility rules; some limited exceptions apply. Players may hold more than one non-FIFA nationality.

No.	Pos.	Nation	Player
7	MF	(Sweden) SWE	Niclas Alexandersson (to IFK Göteborg)
11	MF	(Wales) WAL	Mark Pembridge (to Fulham)

No.	Pos.	Nation	Player
29	MF	(England) ENG	Kevin McLeod (to QPR)
34	DF	(England) ENG	Sean O'Hanlon (to Swindon Town)

== Reserve squad ==
Note: Flags indicate national team as defined under FIFA eligibility rules; some limited exceptions apply. Players may hold more than one non-FIFA nationality.

No.	Pos.	Nation	Player
23	FW	(Italy) ITA	Patrizzio Pascucci
33	MF	(England) ENG	Brian Moogan
36	MF	(England) ENG	Alan Moogan

No.	Pos.	Nation	Player
37	GK	(Scotland) SCO	Iain Turner
38	FW	(England) ENG	Michael Symes
39	MF	(England) ENG	Steven Schumacher

== Statistics ==
=== Appearances ===
As of 15 May 2005

No.	Pos	Nat	Player	Total		Premier League		FA Cup		League Cup	
No.	Pos	Nat	Player	Apps	Goals	Apps	Goals	Apps	Goals	Apps	Goals
1	GK	(England) ENG	Richard Wright	4	0	4	0	0	0	0	0
2	DF	(England) ENG	Steve Watson	29	5	22+5	5	0+1	0	1	0
3	DF	(Italy) ITA	Alessandro Pistone	24	0	20+1	0	2	0	1	0
4	DF	(England) ENG	Alan Stubbs	30	0	25+2	0	2	0	1	0
5	DF	(Scotland) SCO	David Weir	12	0	9+1	0	0	0	1+1	0
6	DF	(England) ENG	David Unsworth	31	3	22+4	3	3	0	1+1	0
8	FW	(Canada) CAN	Tomasz Radzinski	38	8	28+6	8	2	0	0+2	0
9	FW	(England) ENG	Kevin Campbell	18	1	8+9	1	0+1	0	0	0
10	FW	(Scotland) SCO	Duncan Ferguson	24	9	13+7	5	2	2	2	2
11	MF	(Wales) WAL	Mark Pembridge	4	0	4	0	0	0	0	0
11	FW	(England) ENG	Francis Jeffers	22	2	5+13	0	0+3	2	1	0
12	MF	(China) CHN	Li Tie	7	0	4+1	0	0	0	1+1	0
13	GK	(England) ENG	Steve Simonsen	1	0	1	0	0	0	0	0
14	MF	(Republic of Ireland) IRL	Kevin Kilbane	33	4	26+4	3	3	1	0	0
15	DF	(Scotland) SCO	Gary Naysmith	34	2	27+2	2	2+1	0	2	0
16	MF	(Denmark) DEN	Thomas Gravesen	36	2	29+1	2	3	0	3	0
18	FW	(England) ENG	Wayne Rooney	40	9	26+8	9	3	0	2+1	0
20	DF	(Nigeria) NGA	Joseph Yobo	31	2	27+1	2	0+1	0	2	0
21	MF	(Ghana) GHA	Alex Nyarko	14	0	7+4	0	2	0	1	0
22	MF	(Sweden) SWE	Tobias Linderoth	29	1	23+4	0	0	0	1+1	1
24	FW	(Scotland) SCO	James McFadden	27	0	11+12	0	1	0	3	0
25	GK	(England) ENG	Nigel Martyn	40	0	33+1	0	3	0	3	0
26	MF	(Republic of Ireland) IRL	Lee Carsley	25	2	15+6	2	2	0	2	0
27	DF	(England) ENG	Peter Clarke	2	0	1	0	0	0	0+1	0
28	DF	(England) ENG	Tony Hibbert	31	0	24+1	0	3	0	3	0
30	MF	(England) ENG	Nick Chadwick	4	1	1+2	0	0	0	1	1
31	MF	(England) ENG	Leon Osman	5	1	3+1	1	0	0	0+1	0
