= 2004–05 Everton F.C. season =

English football club season

Everton
2004–05 season
- Chairman: Bill Kenwright
- Manager: David Moyes
- Premier League: 4th
- FA Cup: Fifth Round
- League Cup: Fourth Round
- Top goalscorer: League: Tim Cahill (11); All: Tim Cahill (12)
Home colours	Away colours

The 2004-05 Everton F.C. season was Everton's 13th season in the FA Premier League, and their 51st consecutive season in the top division of English football.

Competition	Result	Top scorer
Premier League	4th	(Australia) Tim Cahill, 11
FA Cup	Fifth Round	(Scotland) James McFadden, 2
League Cup	Fourth Round	(Scotland) Duncan Ferguson, 1 (England) Nick Chadwick, 1 (Republic of Ireland) Lee Carsley, 1 (England) Marcus Bent, 1 (Denmark) Thomas Gravesen, 1

== Season summary ==
Many pundits had tipped Everton for relegation that season: having escaped relegation from the Premier League by six points the previous season, Everton's task to stay in English football's top flight only seemed harder after the multimillion-pound transfer of teenage striker Wayne Rooney to Manchester United after setting the summer's European Championships alight. However, the season turned out to be Everton's most successful in Premier League history as they placed fourth in the league with 61pts. Everton kept pace with the likes of Chelsea (95pts) and Arsenal (83pts) at the Premier League summit for the first half of the season, finishing 2004 only a few points adrift of leaders Chelsea. Although Everton's title challenge eventually fizzled out following the sale of out-of-contract midfielder Thomas Gravesen to Spanish giants Real Madrid, they were able to see off competition from arch-rivals Liverpool (58pts) and fellow northwesterners Bolton Wanderers (58pts) to finish in fourth place, three points ahead of both teams. This secured the Toffees qualification to the 2005–06 Champions League, in which they would enter the tournament in the third qualifying round. In the summer, manager David Moyes splashed the cash on the likes of Netherlands and Inter Milan winger Andy van der Meyde in a bid to keep Everton in a position to make a serious challenge for European qualification the following season.

Despite their high league finish, Everton had the unwanted distinction of finishing with a negative goal difference, as a result of an embarrassing 7–0 humbling at Arsenal in the penultimate game of the season.

== Final league table ==
Pos	Team	Pld	W	D	L	GF	GA	GD	Pts	Qualification or relegation
2	Arsenal	38	25	8	5	87	36	+51	83	Qualification for the Champions League group stage
3	Manchester United	38	22	11	5	58	26	+32	77	Qualification for the Champions League third qualifying round
4	Everton	38	18	7	13	45	46	−1	61	Qualification for the Champions League third qualifying round
5	Liverpool	38	17	7	14	52	41	+11	58	Qualification for the Champions League first qualifying round (Note: Although they failed to qualify for the Champions League as one of the top four English clubs, Liverpool were given a special dispensation to compete as the defending champions. They were, however, forced to enter in the first qualifying round.)
6	Bolton Wanderers	38	16	10	12	49	44	+5	58	Qualification for the UEFA Cup first round (Note: Since the finalists of the FA Cup, Arsenal and Manchester United, as well as Chelsea, who won the 2004–05 Football League Cup, were qualified for the Champions League, and the fifth-placed team (Liverpool) were moved to the Champions League, the sixth and seventh-placed teams in the Premier League were rewarded entry to the UEFA Cup.)

Rules for classification: 1) points; 2) goal difference; 3) number of goals scored.

== Players ==
=== First-team squad ===
Squad at end of season

Note: Flags indicate national team as defined under FIFA eligibility rules; some limited exceptions apply. Players may hold more than one non-FIFA nationality.

No.	Pos.	Nation	Player
1	GK	ENG	Richard Wright
2	DF	ENG	Steve Watson
3	DF	ITA	Alessandro Pistone
4	DF	ENG	Alan Stubbs
5	DF	SCO	David Weir (captain)
6	MF	ESP	Mikel Arteta (on loan from Real Sociedad)
7	FW	ENG	Marcus Bent
8	FW	ENG	James Beattie
10	FW	SCO	Duncan Ferguson
11	FW	SCO	James McFadden
14	MF	IRL	Kevin Kilbane

No.	Pos.	Nation	Player
15	DF	SCO	Gary Naysmith
17	MF	AUS	Tim Cahill
20	DF	NGA	Joseph Yobo
21	MF	ENG	Leon Osman
22	DF	ENG	Tony Hibbert
23	DF	AUS	Eddy Bosnar
24	MF	FRA	Guillaume Plessis
25	GK	ENG	Nigel Martyn
26	MF	IRL	Lee Carsley
31	FW	ENG	James Vaughan

=== Left club during season ===
Note: Flags indicate national team as defined under FIFA eligibility rules; some limited exceptions apply. Players may hold more than one non-FIFA nationality.

No.	Pos.	Nation	Player
9	FW	ENG	Kevin Campbell (to West Bromwich Albion)
16	MF	DEN	Thomas Gravesen (to Real Madrid)
18	FW	ENG	Wayne Rooney (to Manchester United)

No.	Pos.	Nation	Player
19	FW	ENG	Nick Chadwick (to Plymouth Argyle)
27	DF	ENG	Peter Clarke (to Blackpool)

=== Reserve squad ===
Note: Flags indicate national team as defined under FIFA eligibility rules; some limited exceptions apply. Players may hold more than one non-FIFA nationality.

No.	Pos.	Nation	Player
12	MF	CHN	Li Tie
32	DF	ENG	Daniel Fox
33	DF	IRL	Anthony Gerrard
37	GK	SCO	Iain Turner

No.	Pos.	Nation	Player
—	DF	ENG	Mark Hughes
—	DF	ENG	Laurence Wilson
—	FW	ENG	Paul Hopkins
—	FW	ITA	Patrizio Pascucci

== Transfers ==
=== In ===
- (England) Marcus Bent - (England) Ipswich Town, £450,000, 23 June
- (Australia) Tim Cahill - (England) Millwall, undisclosed (estimated £2,000,000), 23 July
- (Australia) Eddy Bosnar - (Austria) Sturm Graz, free, 4 August
- (England) James Beattie - (England) Southampton, £6,000,000, 4 January
- (Spain) Mikel Arteta - (Spain) Real Sociedad, five-month loan, 1 February
- (Iceland) Bjarni Viðarsson - (Iceland) FH, undisclosed

=== Out ===
- (England) Joey Jones - (England) Macclesfield Town, free, 18 May
- (Sweden) Niclas Alexandersson - Gothenburg, free, 1 July
- (England) Paul Gerrard - (England) Nottingham Forest, free, 2 July
- (England) Steve Simonsen - (England) Stoke City, free, 8 July
- (England) David Unsworth - (England) Portsmouth, free, 12 July
- (Canada) Tomasz Radzinski - (England) Fulham, undisclosed, 23 July
- (Sweden) Tobias Linderoth - (Denmark) Copenhagen, undisclosed, 30 July
- (England) Steven Schumacher - (England) Bradford City, free, 30 July
- (England) Michael Symes - (England) Bradford City, free, 30 July
- (Scotland) Scot Gemmill - (England) Leicester City, free, 5 August
- (England) Wayne Rooney - (England) Manchester United, £20,000,000 (rising to £27,000,000 depending on appearances and achievements), 31 August
- (England) Kevin Campbell - (England) West Bromwich Albion, free, 10 January
- (Denmark) Thomas Gravesen - (Spain) Real Madrid, £2,500,000, 14 January
- (England) Nick Chadwick - (England) Plymouth Argyle, £250,000, 8 February
- (England) Peter Clarke - (England) Blackpool

== Results ==
=== Premier League ===
==== Results by round ====
Round	1	2	3	4	5	6	7	8	9	10	11	12	13	14	15	16	17	18	19	20	21	22	23	24	25	26	27	28	29	30	31	32	33	34	35	36	37	38
Ground	H	A	H	A	A	H	A	H	H	A	H	A	A	H	A	H	H	A	H	A	A	H	A	H	H	A	H	A	H	A	A	H	H	H	A	H	A	A
Result	L	W	W	D	W	W	W	L	W	W	D	L	W	W	D	W	W	D	W	L	L	W	D	L	W	D	L	W	L	L	L	W	W	D	L	W	L	L
Position	20	9	11	7	5	3	3	3	3	3	3	3	3	3	3	3	2	3	3	4	4	4	4	4	4	4	4	4	4	4	4	4	4	4	4	4	4	4

Updated to match(es) played on 15 May 2005 (end of season). Source: worldfootball.net
A = Away; H = Home; W = Win; D = Draw; L = Loss

==== Matches ====
15 August 2004 1	Everton	1–4	Arsenal	Liverpool, Merseyside
	Carsley (yellow card) 37' (goal) 64'; Osman (yellow card) 43'	Report	Bergkamp 23'; Reyes 39'; Cole (yellow card) 53'; Ljungberg 54'; Pires 83'	Stadium: Goodison Park; Attendance: 35,521; Referee: Mike Riley

21 August 2004 2	Crystal Palace	1–3	Everton	Croydon, London
	Hudson 9'	Report	Gravesen 19' (pen.); Naysmith (red card) 71'; Bent 82'	Stadium: Selhurst Park; Attendance: 23,666; Referee: Mark Clattenburg

28 August 2004 3	Everton	2–1	West Bromwich Albion	Liverpool, Merseyside
	Osman 2', 70'	Report	Dobie 7'	Stadium: Goodison Park; Attendance: 34,510; Referee: Peter Walton

30 August 2004 4	Manchester United	0–0	Everton	Trafford, Greater Manchester
		Report		Stadium: Old Trafford; Attendance: 67,803; Referee: Dermot Gallagher

11 September 2004 5	Manchester City	0–1	Everton	Manchester
15:00		Report	Cahill 60' (red card) 61'	Stadium: City of Manchester Stadium; Attendance: 47,006; Referee: Steve Bennett

19 September 2004 6	Everton	1–0	Middlesbrough	Liverpool, Merseyside
	Bent 47'	Report		Stadium: Goodison Park; Attendance: 34,078; Referee: Howard Webb

26 September 2004 7	Portsmouth	0–1	Everton	Portsmouth, Hampshire
		Report	Cahill 80'	Stadium: Fratton Park; Attendance: 20,125; Referee: Dermot Gallagher

2 October 2004 8	Everton	0–1	Tottenham Hotspur	Liverpool, Merseyside
		Report	Pamarot 53'	Stadium: Goodison Park; Attendance: 38,264; Referee: Graham Poll

16 October 2004 9	Everton	1–0	Southampton	Liverpool, Merseyside
	Osman 88'	Report		Stadium: Goodison Park; Attendance: 35,256; Referee: Barry Knight

23 October 2004 10	Norwich City	2–3	Everton	Norwich, Norfolk
12:45 BST	McKenzie 48'; Francis 57'	Report	Kilbane 10'; Bent 40'; Ferguson 73'	Stadium: Carrow Road; Attendance: 23,871; Referee: Mark Clattenburg

30 October 2004 11	Everton	1–1	Aston Villa	Liverpool, Merseyside
	Bent 33'	Report	Hendrie 26'	Stadium: Goodison Park; Attendance: 37,816; Referee: Steve Dunn

6 November 2004 12	Chelsea	1–0	Everton	Fulham, London
	Robben 72'	Report		Stadium: Stamford Bridge; Attendance: 41,965; Referee: Mike Riley

13 November 2004 13	Birmingham City	0–1	Everton	Birmingham, West Midlands
17:15 GMT (UTC)		Report	Gravesen 69' (pen.)	Stadium: St Andrew's; Attendance: 28,388; Referee: Rob Styles

20 November 2004 14	Everton	1–0	Fulham	Liverpool, Merseyside
	Ferguson 67'	Report		Stadium: Goodison Park; Attendance: 34,763; Referee: Graham Poll

28 November 2004 15	Newcastle United	1–1	Everton	Newcastle upon Tyne, Tyneside
	Bellamy 5'	Report	Carsley 56'	Stadium: St James' Park; Attendance: 51,247; Referee: Neale Barry

4 December 2004 16	Everton	3–2	Bolton Wanderers	Liverpool, Merseyside
	Ferguson 45'; Gravesen 75'; Jaïdi 85' (o.g.)	Report	Davies 16', 59'	Stadium: Goodison Park; Attendance: 35,929; Referee: Howard Webb

11 December 2004 17	Everton	1–0	Liverpool	Liverpool, Merseyside
	Carsley 68'	Report		Stadium: Goodison Park; Attendance: 40,552; Referee: Steve Bennett

18 December 2004 18	Blackburn Rovers	0–0	Everton	Blackburn, Lancashire
		Report		Stadium: Ewood Park; Attendance: 25,191; Referee: Mark Halsey

26 December 2004 19	Everton	2–1	Manchester City	Liverpool, Merseyside
15:00	Cahill 22'; Bent 63'	Report	Fowler 42'; Negouai (red card) 83'	Stadium: Goodison Park; Attendance: 40,530; Referee: Phil Dowd

28 December 2004 20	Charlton Athletic	2–0	Everton	Greenwich, London
	El Karkouri 82'; Hreidarsson 85'	Report	Ferguson (red card) 83'	Stadium: The Valley; Attendance: 27,001; Referee: Mike Riley

1 January 2005 21	Tottenham Hotspur	5–2	Everton	Haringey, London
	Marney 16', 80'; Ziegler 27'; Mendes 59'; Keane 68'	Report	Cahill 40'; McFadden 87'	Stadium: White Hart Lane; Attendance: 36,102; Referee: Steve Dunn

4 January 2005 22	Everton	2–1	Portsmouth	Liverpool, Merseyside
	Stubbs 29'; Osman 90'	Report	Yakubu 31'	Stadium: Goodison Park; Attendance: 35,480; Referee: Peter Walton

16 January 2005 23	Middlesbrough	1–1	Everton	Middlesbrough, North Yorkshire
	Zenden 26'	Report	Cahill 76'	Stadium: Riverside Stadium; Attendance: 31,794; Referee: Dermot Gallagher

22 January 2005 24	Everton	0–1	Charlton Athletic	Liverpool, Merseyside
		Report	Holland 45'	Stadium: Goodison Park; Attendance: 36,041; Referee: Howard Webb

2 February 2005 25	Everton	1–0	Norwich City	Liverpool, Merseyside
19:45 GMT	Doherty 78' (o.g.)	Report		Stadium: Goodison Park; Attendance: 37,485; Referee: Alan Wiley

6 February 2005 26	Southampton	2–2	Everton	Southampton, Hampshire
	Crouch 36'; Camara 55'	Report	Beattie 4'; Bent 90'	Stadium: St. Mary's Stadium; Attendance: 31,509; Referee: Andy D'Urso

12 February 2005 27	Everton	0–1	Chelsea	Liverpool, Merseyside
	Beattie (red card) 8'	Report	Guðjohnsen 69'	Stadium: Goodison Park; Attendance: 40,270; Referee: Mike Riley

26 February 2005 28	Aston Villa	1–3	Everton	Birmingham, West Midlands
	Solano 46'	Report	Osman 17', 67'; Cahill 48'	Stadium: Villa Park; Attendance: 40,248; Referee: Graham Poll

6 March 2005 29	Everton	0–1	Blackburn Rovers	Liverpool, Merseyside
		Report	Stead 71'	Stadium: Goodison Park; Attendance: 32,406; Referee: Phil Dowd

20 March 2005 30	Liverpool	2–1	Everton	Liverpool, Merseyside
	Gerrard 27'; Luis García 32'	Report	Cahill 82'	Stadium: Anfield; Attendance: 44,224; Referee: Rob Styles

3 April 2005 31	West Bromwich Albion	1–0	Everton	West Bromwich, West Midlands
	Gera 63'	Report		Stadium: The Hawthorns; Attendance: 26,805; Referee: Graham Poll

10 April 2005 32	Everton	4–0	Crystal Palace	Liverpool, Merseyside
	Arteta 7'; Cahill 47', 54'; Vaughan 87'	Report		Stadium: Goodison Park; Attendance: 36,519; Referee: Uriah Rennie

20 April 2005 33	Everton	1–0	Manchester United	Liverpool, Merseyside
	Ferguson 55'	Report	G. Neville (red card) 72'; Scholes (red card) 90'	Stadium: Goodison Park; Attendance: 37,160; Referee: Phil Dowd

23 April 2005 34	Everton	1–1	Birmingham City	Liverpool, Merseyside
12:30 BST (UTC+01)	Ferguson 86'	Report	Heskey 5'	Stadium: Goodison Park; Attendance: 36,828; Referee: Andy D'Urso

30 April 2005 35	Fulham	2–0	Everton	Fulham, London
	John 15'; McBride 39'	Report		Stadium: Craven Cottage; Attendance: 21,881; Referee: Steve Bennett

7 May 2005 36	Everton	2–0	Newcastle United	Liverpool, Merseyside
	Weir 43'; Cahill 59'	Report	Ameobi (red card) 56'	Stadium: Goodison Park; Attendance: 40,438; Referee: Barry Knight

11 May 2005 37	Arsenal	7–0	Everton	Islington, London
	van Persie 8'; Pires 12', 50'; Vieira 37'; Edu 70' (pen.); Bergkamp 77'; Flamini 85'	Report		Stadium: Highbury; Attendance: 38,073; Referee: Alan Wiley

15 May 2005 38	Bolton Wanderers	3–2	Everton	Bolton, Greater Manchester
	Ngotty (red card) 45'; Jaidi 53'; Davies 61'; Stelios 66'	Report	Cahill 9'; Carsley 63'	Stadium: Reebok Stadium; Attendance: 27,701; Referee: Neale Barry

=== FA Cup ===
- Plymouth Argyle 1–3 Everton (attendance 20,112)
- Everton 3–0 Sunderland (attendance 33,186)
- Everton 0–2 Manchester United (attendance 38,664)

=== League Cup ===
- 22 September 2004: Bristol City 2–2 Everton (3–4 pen.)
- 27 October 2004: Everton 2–0 Preston North End

9 November 2004	Arsenal	3–1	Everton	London
	Owusu-Abeyie 25'; Lupoli 52', 85'	Report	Gravesen 8'	Stadium: Highbury; Attendance: 27,791; Referee: Alan Wiley

== Statistics ==
=== Appearances and goals ===
No.	Pos	Nat	Player	Total		Premier League		FA Cup		League Cup	
No.	Pos	Nat	Player	Apps	Goals	Apps	Goals	Apps	Goals	Apps	Goals
Goalkeepers
1	GK	(England) ENG	Richard Wright	12	0	6+1	0	2	0	3	0
25	GK	(England) ENG	Nigel Martyn	33	0	32	0	1	0	0	0
Defenders
3	DF	(Italy) ITA	Alessandro Pistone	39	0	32+1	0	2+1	0	2+1	0
4	DF	(England) ENG	Alan Stubbs	36	1	29+2	1	3	0	2	0
5	DF	(Scotland) SCO	David Weir	37	0	34	0	0+2	0	1	0
15	DF	(Scotland) SCO	Gary Naysmith	15	0	5+6	0	3	0	1	0
20	DF	(Nigeria) NGA	Joseph Yobo	33	0	19+8	0	3	0	3	0
22	DF	(England) ENG	Tony Hibbert	40	0	35+1	0	1	0	3	0
Midfielders
2	MF	(England) ENG	Steve Watson	28	0	12+13	0	0	0	3	0
6	MF	(Spain) ESP	Mikel Arteta	13	1	10+2	1	1	0	0	0
12	MF	(China) CHN	Li Tie	0	0	0	0	0	0	0	0
14	MF	(Republic of Ireland) IRL	Kevin Kilbane	43	1	37+1	1	3	0	2	0
17	MF	(Australia) AUS	Tim Cahill	38	12	33	11	1+1	1	2+1	0
21	MF	(England) ENG	Leon Osman	35	7	24+5	6	3	1	2+1	0
26	MF	(Republic of Ireland) IRL	Lee Carsley	41	5	35+1	4	3	0	2	1
Forwards
7	FW	(England) ENG	Marcus Bent	42	7	31+6	6	2+1	0	1+1	1
8	FW	(England) ENG	James Beattie	13	2	7+4	1	2	1	0	0
10	FW	(Scotland) SCO	Duncan Ferguson	37	6	6+29	5	0	0	2	1
11	FW	(Scotland) SCO	James McFadden	29	3	7+16	1	3	2	3	0
31	FW	(England) ENG	James Vaughan	2	1	0+2	1	0	0	0	0
Players transferred out during the season
9	FW	(England) ENG	Kevin Campbell	7	0	4+2	0	0	0	0+1	0
16	MF	(Denmark) DEN	Thomas Gravesen	23	5	20+1	4	0+1	0	1	1
19	FW	(England) ENG	Nick Chadwick	5	2	0+1	0	0+2	1	0+2	1

Last updated: 30 May 2005
Source: Competitions
