= Kono, Rivers =

Village in Nigeria

Coordinates: 4.6010°N 7.5027°E

Kono is a village in Rivers State, Nigeria. It is situated on the coast in Khana Local Government Area, about 45 miles (72.4 km) from Port Harcourt. The dialect spoken in Kono is Khana, and the people are Ogoni. Former Footballer Joseph Yobo was born and grew up in Kono. The present traditional Ruler in Kono is Mr Anson Monday Nwige. The Community has about four oil wells. It can boast of ethnic and cultural events which include the Waaro festival and Nwikorobee Festival. These festivals attract many visitors.
