= Peter Gravesen =

Danish footballer (born 1979)

Personal information
- Full name: Peter Gravesen
- Date of birth: 11 February 1979 (age 47)
- Place of birth: Denmark
- Height: 1.81 m (5 ft 11 1/2 in)
- Position: Midfielder

Senior career*
Years	Team	Apps	(Gls)
2000–2004	Vejle Boldklub	107	(2)
2004–2006	Herfølge Boldklub	46	(7)
2006–2008	Fylkir	48	(7)
2009	Blokhus FC		
2009–2010	APEP	3	(0)
2010–2011	Vejle Boldklub		
- * Club domestic league appearances and goals

Peter Gravesen (born 11 February 1979) is a Danish former footballer who played as a midfielder. He started his career with Danish Superliga clubs Vejle Boldklub and Herfølge Boldklub, and has played for Fylkir in Iceland and APEP in Cyprus.

He is the younger brother of Thomas Gravesen.
