= Steve Watson =

English footballer and manager (born 1974)

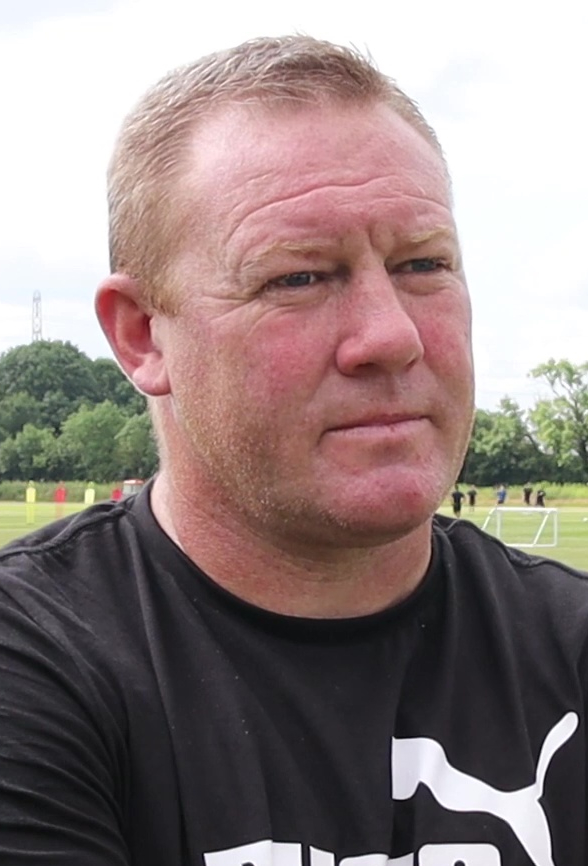
- Watson as manager of York City in 2021

Personal information
- Full name: Steven Craig Watson
- Date of birth: 1 April 1974 (age 52)
- Place of birth: North Shields, England
- Height: 6 ft 1 in (1.85 m)
- Positions: Right-back; midfielder

Youth career
- Wallsend Boys Club
- –1990: Newcastle United

Senior career*
Years	Team	Apps	(Gls)
1990–1998	Newcastle United	208	(12)
1998–2000	Aston Villa	41	(0)
2000–2005	Everton	126	(14)
2005–2007	West Bromwich Albion	42	(1)
2007	→ Sheffield Wednesday (loan)	11	(0)
2007–2009	Sheffield Wednesday	45	(5)
Total		473	(32)

International career
1992–1995	England U21	12	(1)
1998	England B	1	(0)

Managerial career
- 2017–2019: Gateshead
- 2019–2021: York City
- 2021–2022: Chester
- 2023–2026: Darlington
- * Club domestic league appearances and goals

Steven Craig Watson (born 1 April 1974) is an English football manager and former professional player who was most recently the manager of National League North club Darlington.

As a player, he was a right-back or midfielder. He played in the Premier League and Football League for Newcastle United, Aston Villa, Everton, West Bromwich Albion and Sheffield Wednesday. He was capped once by the England national B team, having previously played twelve times and scored once for the under-21s.

Watson moved into coaching after retiring from playing and was appointed as an academy coach at Huddersfield Town under former teammate Lee Clark in 2010. He then followed Clark to Birmingham City before a spell as assistant manager of Macclesfield Town. He was given his first managerial role in 2017 when he joined Gateshead, before becoming York City manager in 2019. He left the club in 2021 and spent four months as manager of Chester before joining Darlington in December 2023.

== Playing career ==
=== Newcastle United ===
Watson was born in North Shields, Tyne and Wear. He began his career with Newcastle United, playing on a regular basis. At the time of his first-team debut, as a substitute in a 2–1 defeat to Wolverhampton Wanderers on 10 November 1990, he was the youngest person ever to play for Newcastle, a record that still stands. Watson appeared 24 times that season, firstly under Jim Smith and then under Ossie Ardiles as Newcastle struggled in the Second Division.

Watson featured prominently during the 1991–92 season as Kevin Keegan returned to Newcastle and relegation to the Third Division was avoided. During his seven years at the club, he wore a jersey with every shirt number 2–11 at least once, earning a reputation as a key all round capable footballer integral to The Entertainers style of play. He came on as a 77th-minute substitute at Wembley Stadium in the 1998 FA Cup Final, in which Newcastle were beaten 2–0 by Arsenal.

=== Aston Villa, Everton and West Bromwich Albion ===
Watson was transferred to Aston Villa for £4 million in October 1998. He scored once for Villa, in a 4–0 home win over Southampton on 1 December 1999 in the League Cup.

He moved to Everton on 4 July 2000 on a five-year contract for a £2.5 million transfer fee. When boss Walter Smith found his squad decimated by injury, Watson was used a striker alongside Tomasz Radzinski, a role he had started to play at the beginning of his career before transferring to the defence. His time with Everton was blighted with injury, although he did enjoy some time in the first team for the 2003–04 season, which included three goals against Leeds United on 28 September 2003. This made him the first Everton player to score a hat-trick in any competition since Nick Barmby in February 2000.

Watson signed for West Bromwich Albion on 5 July 2005 on a three-year contract on a free transfer, after rejecting the offer of a new one-year contract with Everton. He made his debut as an 80th-minute substitute in a 0–0 draw away to Manchester City on 13 August. His only goal for the club came on 2 January 2006, with a shot that came after receiving the ball from Jonathan Greening in the 77th minute of a 2–1 home defeat to Aston Villa.

=== Sheffield Wednesday ===
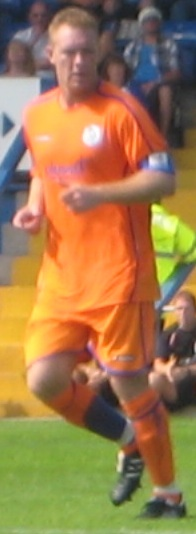
Watson playing for Sheffield Wednesday in 2008

Watson joined Sheffield Wednesday on 9 February 2007 on loan until the end of the 2006–07 season, with opportunities at West Brom limited. He made his debut the following day, starting in a 1–1 draw away to Burnley. Before he joined them, Wednesday had lost five matches in a row. However, they won six, drew four and only lost once when Watson was in the team. He was re-called by West Brom on 26 April with two matches remaining as cover for the injured Curtis Davies and the suspended Neil Clement. Watson signed for Wednesday permanently on 10 July 2007 on a free transfer. His first goal for the club came on 6 November with an equaliser in the fifth minute of stoppage time as Wednesday drew 1–1 away to West Brom.

Watson succeeded Lee Bullen as club captain for the 2008–09 season, taking charge of off-the-field matters, with Richard Wood retaining his role as team captain and being responsible for on-the-field affairs. Watson scored the winner in the Steel City derby against Sheffield United on 19 October; his volleyed lob over Paddy Kenny in the 35th minute gave Wednesday a 1–0 win. Sheffield Wednesday decided to release Watson on 14 May 2009 due to long-term injury problems. He subsequently retired from playing.

== Coaching and managerial career ==
Watson was appointed as development coach at League One club Huddersfield Town on 13 November 2010, joining up with his former Newcastle teammate Lee Clark. Watson was appointed as a coach at Birmingham City of the Championship on 24 August 2012. He was dismissed along with Clark on 20 October 2014. He was appointed as the assistant manager at National League club Macclesfield Town on 4 July 2016.

Watson was appointed as the manager of National League club Gateshead on 10 October 2017. He was appointed as the manager of National League North club York City on 10 January 2019, succeeding Sam Collins who was dismissed with the team 15th in the table. Watson was joined at the club by Micky Cummins, his assistant at Gateshead. He was awarded the National League North Manager of the Month award for October 2021 after three wins from four in the league. He left the club on 13 November.

Watson was appointed manager of National League North club Chester on 23 December 2021, initially on a contract until the end of the 2021–22 season. On 28 April 2022, the club confirmed that Watson would leave his role as manager at the end of the season by mutual consent.

Watson joined another National League North club, Darlington, as manager on 31 December 2023. His contract initially ran until the end of the season. After successfully steering them clear of the relegation positions, he and assistant manager Terry Mitchell signed two-year contract extensions. For his impressive end to the season, Watson was named National League North Manager of the Month for April 2024. On 27 March 2026, it was announced that Watson had signed a new contract to keep him with the club until the end of the 2027–28 season. On 19 October 2026, it was announced that Watson had left his role as manager following discussions with the directors of the club.

== Career statistics ==
Appearances and goals by club, season and competition
Club	Season	League			FA Cup		League Cup		Other		Total	
Club	Season	Division	Apps	Goals	Apps	Goals	Apps	Goals	Apps	Goals	Apps	Goals
Newcastle United	1990–91	Second Division	24	0	3	0	0	0	1 (Note: Appearance in Full Members' Cup)	0	28	0
Newcastle United	1991–92	Second Division	28	1	2	0	0	0	0	0	30	1
Newcastle United	1992–93	First Division	2	0	0	0	0	0	3 (Note: Appearances in Anglo-Italian Cup)	0	5	0
Newcastle United	1993–94	Premier League	32	2	3	0	3	0	—		38	2
Newcastle United	1994–95	Premier League	27	4	1	0	4	0	3 (Note: Appearances in UEFA Cup)	1	35	5
Newcastle United	1995–96	Premier League	23	3	1	0	5	1	—		29	4
Newcastle United	1996–97	Premier League	36	1	3	0	1	0	6 (Note: One appearance in FA Charity Shield, five in UEFA Cup)	0	46	1
Newcastle United	1997–98	Premier League	29	1	4	0	3	0	8 (Note: Appearances in UEFA Champions League)	0	44	1
Newcastle United	1998–99	Premier League	7	0	—		—		1 (Note: Appearances in UEFA Cup Winners' Cup)	0	8	0
Newcastle United	Total		208	12	17	0	16	1	22	1	263	14
Aston Villa	1998–99	Premier League	27	0	2	0	1	0	—		30	0
Aston Villa	1999–2000	Premier League	14	0	2	0	8	1	—		24	1
Aston Villa	Total		41	0	4	0	9	1	0	0	54	1
Everton	2000–01	Premier League	34	0	2	1	2	0	—		38	1
Everton	2001–02	Premier League	25	4	0	0	1	0	—		26	4
Everton	2002–03	Premier League	18	5	0	0	1	1	—		19	6
Everton	2003–04	Premier League	24	5	1	0	1	0	—		26	5
Everton	2004–05	Premier League	25	0	0	0	3	0	—		28	0
Everton	Total		126	14	3	1	8	1	0	0	137	16
West Bromwich Albion	2005–06	Premier League	30	1	0	0	1	0	—		31	1
West Bromwich Albion	2006–07	Championship	12	0	0	0	1	0	—		13	0
West Bromwich Albion	Total		42	1	0	0	2	0	0	0	44	1
Sheffield Wednesday (loan)	2006–07	Championship	11	0	—		—		—		11	0
Sheffield Wednesday	2007–08	Championship	23	2	1	1	1	0	—		25	3
Sheffield Wednesday	2008–09	Championship	22	3	0	0	1	0	—		23	3
Sheffield Wednesday	Total		56	5	1	1	2	0	0	0	59	6
Career total			473	32	25	2	37	3	22	1	557	38

== Managerial statistics ==
As of match played 17 October 2026

Managerial record by team and tenure
Team	From	To	Record					Ref.
Team	From	To	P	W	D	L	Win %	Ref.
Gateshead	10 October 2017	10 January 2019	75	29	20	26	38.7	
York City	10 January 2019	13 November 2021	91	47	19	25	51.6	
Chester	23 December 2021	7 May 2022	25	7	7	11	28.0	
Darlington	31 December 2023	19 October 2026	130	53	27	50	40.8	
Total			321	136	73	112	42.4	

== Honours ==
=== As a player ===
Newcastle United

- FA Cup runner-up: 1997–98

Individual

- Newcastle United Player of the Year: 1996–97

=== As a manager ===
Individual

- National League North Manager of the Month: October 2021, April 2024, December 2024
