= Albert Yobo =

Nigerian footballer

Personal information
- Full name: Michael Albert Yobo
- Date of birth: 5 May 1979 (age 47)
- Place of birth: Port Harcourt, Nigeria
- Height: 1.85 m (6 ft 1 in)
- Position: Defender

Senior career*
Years	Team	Apps	(Gls)
1995–1997	Rangers International		
1998–2000	AJ Auxerre		
2001	VfL Osnabrück		
2002	Grazer AK		
2003–2004	FC Zwolle	21	(0)
2004–2005	Pontevedra CF	19	(1)

International career^{‡}
1995	Nigeria U-17	3	(0)
2003	Nigeria	1	(0)
- * Club domestic league appearances and goals as of 10:13, 10 April 2007 (UTC) ‡ National team caps and goals as of 23 July 2005

Michael Albert Yobo (born May, 1979 in Port Harcourt, Nigeria) is a retired Nigerian football defender. Previously, he played for AJ Auxerre, VfL Osnabrück, Grazer AK, FC Zwolle, and Pontevedra CF in Europe.

He is the older brother of Nigeria international captain Joseph Yobo. In July 2008, their younger brother Norum Yobo was kidnapped in Port Harcourt, Rivers State, Nigeria and held for ransom. He was eventually released after 12 days on 17 July 2008.

His brothers charity, the Joseph Yobo Foundation, run a youth football tournament in Nigeria which bears his name, the Albert Yobo Soccer Championship.

== Career ==
Yobo made his debut for Nigeria aged 18 against Zambia in a friendly in December 1997.

== Charity work ==
In 2007, his brother Joseph Yobo set up the Joseph Yobo Charity Foundation, to help under-privileged children in Nigeria. As of 18 July 2007, together they have handed out over 300 scholarship awards ranging from primary to university level. Yobo has started a football academy in the Ogoni region of Nigeria. He also runs football camps in Lagos. See the Everton Lagos project for more information.
