= Joseph Yobo =

Nigerian footballer (born 1980)

Joseph Yobo OON
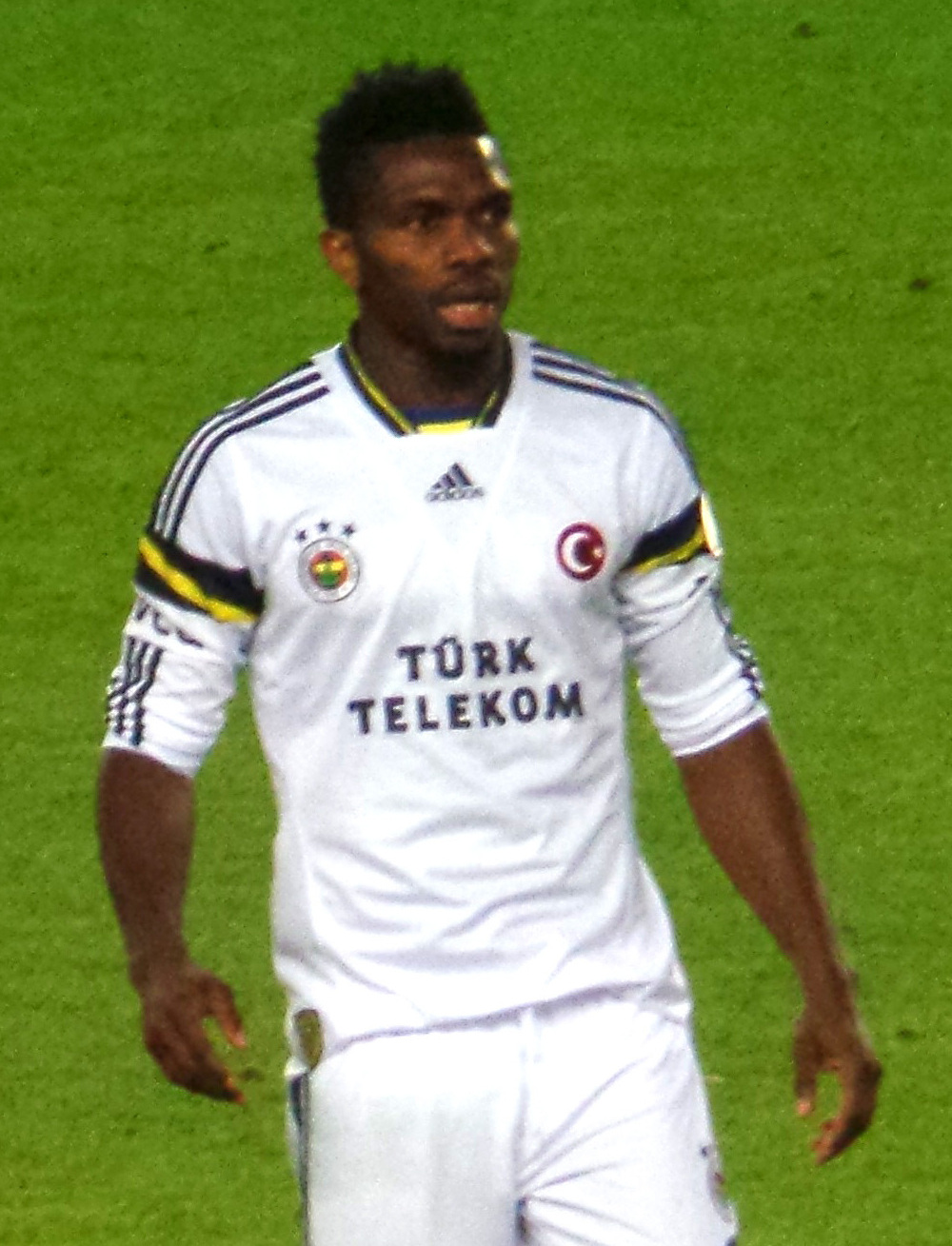
- Yobo playing for Fenerbahçe in 2013

Personal information
- Full name: Joseph Michael Yobo
- Date of birth: 6 September 1980 (age 46)
- Place of birth: Kono, Rivers State, Nigeria
- Height: 1.88 m (6 ft 2 in)
- Position: Defender

Youth career
- 1996–1997: Michellin-Harcourt
- 1997–1998: Standard Liège

Senior career*
Years	Team	Apps	(Gls)
1998–2001	Standard Liège	46	(2)
2001–2003	Marseille	23	(0)
2001–2002	→ Tenerife (loan)	0	(0)
2002–2003	→ Everton (loan)	24	(0)
2003–2012	Everton	196	(8)
2010–2012	→ Fenerbahçe (loan)	69	(2)
2012–2014	Fenerbahçe	21	(1)
2014	→ Norwich City (loan)	8	(0)
Total		387	(13)

International career
2001–2014	Nigeria	101	(7)
Medal record
Men's football
Representing Nigeria
Africa Cup of Nations
Winner	2013
- * Club domestic league appearances and goals

Joseph Michael Yobo (born 6 September 1980) is a Nigerian former professional footballer who played as a centre back.

Yobo started his career at Standard Liège and Marseille before joining Everton in 2002. He spent 10 years at the club and became the first African player to captain Everton. After leaving Everton, he spent time at Fenerbahçe and Norwich City. He was the captain of the Nigerian national team until his international football retirement in June 2014, and was Nigeria's record appearance holder. He was part of nine Nigerian international squads. In February 2020, he was appointed assistant coach of the Super Eagles by the Nigeria Football Federation.

== Early years ==
Yobo's birthplace and origin is Kono, an Ogoni community in Khana Local Government Area of Rivers State, Nigeria.

Yobo left Nigeria to join Standard Liège in 1998. He made his first team debut in 2000, and went on to appear 46 times. In 2001, he was bought by Marseille.

== Club career ==
=== Everton ===
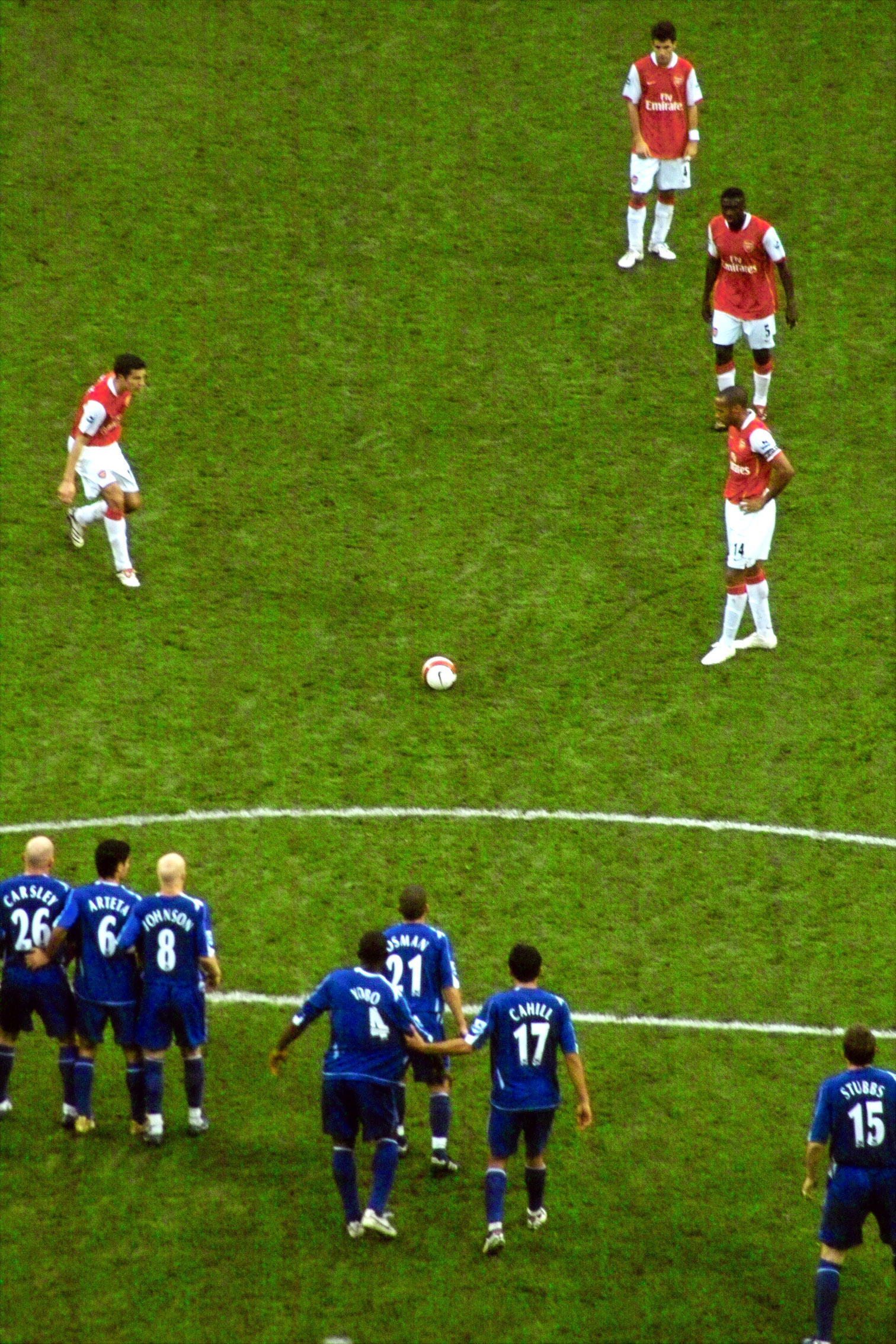
Yobo (#4) playing for Everton against Arsenal.

Soon after making his debut, Yobo was loaned to Tenerife. After around nine months, Yobo returned to Marseille, before joining Everton, again on loan, in July 2002. A £1 million fee was required to register the player, and he became the first signing of David Moyes. An option to make the move permanent was taken up and completed in 2003 after a dispute between Yobo and Marseille was settled, with Everton agreeing a fixed additional fee of £4 million.

Yobo became one of the most consistent players in the Everton squad, and was one of only seven players in the entire league to play every minute of every game throughout the 2006–07 season; his teammate Joleon Lescott also being an ever-present throughout the season.

The delay, in 2006, in signing a new contract with Everton lead to rumours of a move to Arsenal, but on 22 July, Yobo committed himself to Goodison Park until 2010. On 15 April 2007, Yobo became the record appearance holder for an overseas player at Everton, a record he held until early 2012. For the UEFA Cup match against AEL of Greece on 25 October 2007, Yobo was named as captain in the absence of Phil Neville and thus became the first African to captain the club. On 6 May 2009, Yobo scored his first goal of the season against West Ham United to seal a 3–1 win.

In the 2009–10 season, Yobo had to adjust to his new defensive partner, Sylvain Distin, after Joleon Lescott left and Phil Jagielka became injured. On 29 November 2009, he scored an own goal in Everton's 2–0 defeat to Liverpool in the Merseyside derby. Distin, Jagielka and John Heitinga were increasingly selected over Yobo, confining him to the bench.

=== Fenerbahçe ===
On 31 August 2010, Yobo signed a one-year loan contract with Fenerbahçe. Yobo played in 30 official matches and scored a goal, helping his team win the league title. On 6 September 2011, Fenerbahçe and Everton agreed on another loan deal for €700,000 and Yobo signed a one-year contract worth €2.35 million. On 4 August 2012, he re-signed for Fenerbahçe once again, but this time on a permanent basis on a three-year contract, after having played for Everton for 10 years. On 17 August Fenerbahçe played against Torku Konyaspor and Yobo scored a goal in this match. Before the 2014–2015 season his contract with Fenerbahçe was terminated with mutual agreement. On 31 August 2014, he was awarded with the plaque of appreciation and have been released from Fenerbahçe.

=== Norwich City ===
On 30 January 2014, Yobo returned to England on loan at Norwich City for the remainder of the season with a view to a permanent move in the summer.

He marked his debut for the club with a clean sheet against top-scoring club Manchester City on 8 February.

== International career ==
Yobo is a former Nigeria international, who has been capped 101 times and represented the Super Eagles at three FIFA World Cups and six Africa Cup of Nations tournaments.

After participating in Nigeria's run to the 1999 FIFA World Youth Championship quarter-finals, Yobo made his senior international debut against Zambia in a 2002 FIFA World Cup qualifier on 24 March 2001. He played in all six of the team's matches in the 2002 Africa Cup of Nations and was included in the squad for the 2002 FIFA World Cup, where he was again ever-present, assisting Julius Aghahowa's goal in a 2–1 loss to Sweden.

Yobo made his second World Cup appearance at the 2010 tournament in South Africa, after which he assumed the captaincy on the international retirement of Nwankwo Kanu. The veteran defender was no longer a first choice player at the 2013 Africa Cup of Nations, but lifted the trophy after appearing as an 89th-minute substitute in Nigeria's 1–0 final defeat of Burkina Faso.

In June 2014, Yobo was included in Stephen Keshi's squad for the 2014 FIFA World Cup. He was named in the starting line-up for both the second and third group matches, helping the Super Eagles to clean sheet in a 1–0 victory over Bosnia and Herzegovina. On 30 June, he made his 100th international appearance, captaining Nigeria against France in the round of 16. After scoring an own goal in the 2–0 defeat, Yobo announced his international retirement, saying: "This is it. I can look back on my career with great pride. I wanted to leave on a high for my country. Defeat by France was not the right way to go but I'm happy with all I've done for the national team. It's time to give a chance to other people to come through."

== Coaching career ==
On 12 February 2020, Yobo was appointed assistant coach of the Super Eagles by the Nigeria Football Federation after a brief meeting held in Abuja. He was appointed assistant coach to replace Imama Amapakabo.

Yobo said "I am bringing back that motivation. As a former captain, I'm bringing inspiration. I've been there and I've done it all. I was a fan of the team before I became an assistant coach, so I've seen from a fanatical point of view how people feel when they are watching the team. We as players, while playing, don't notice these things but after my retirement, I've been a pundit, I've given my opinion about what should be done in the team." He also said "I'm bringing back my experience. Having over 15 years of consistency in my career, I think this is a lot. The good thing is that the spirit is going to improve. Having been a pundit and looking at the team, I think we can go a lot higher with the quality we have".

== Personal life ==
In 2010, following a brief courtship, Yobo married former MBGN Adaeze Igwe in a midnight ceremony held in Jos. The couple wedded in a very low key ceremony barely three months after they met in December 2009. However, it is known that they are said to be trying to hide their marital troubles from the press and general public. The couple welcomed a baby boy named Joey Yobo April 2010.

He is the younger brother of former Nigeria international Albert Yobo. In July 2008, his younger brother Norum was kidnapped in Port Harcourt, Rivers State, Nigeria and held for ransom. He was eventually released after 12 days on 17 July 2008.

It was widely reported in the Nigerian media that Yobo went to T.B. Joshua for prayers after suffering a hamstring injury in the 2010 Africa Cup of Nations. Yobo and his wife, Adaeze Igwe were conferred with chieftaincy titles of Mene Aborlo 1 and Waamene Aborlo 1 respectively of Ogoniland by King GNK Gininwa of Ogoni Kingdom on Saturday, 28 May 2016. This was a day after his testimonial match marking his exit from active football was organised by the Rivers State Government on Friday, 27 May 2016

== Charity work ==
In 2007, Yobo set up the Joseph Yobo Charity Foundation, to help under-privileged children in Nigeria. As of 18 July 2007, he has handed out over 300 scholarship awards ranging from primary to university level. Yobo has started a football academy in the Ogoni region of Nigeria. He also runs football camps in Lagos.

== Career statistics ==
=== Club ===
Appearances and goals by club, season and competition
Club	Season	League			National cup		League cup		Continental		Total	
Club	Season	Division	Apps	Goals	Apps	Goals	Apps	Goals	Apps	Goals	Apps	Goals
Standard Liège	2000–01	Belgian First Division	30	2			–		–		30	2
Olympique Marseille	2001–02	Division 1	23	0					–		23	0
Everton (loan)	2002–03	Premier League	24	0	0	0	2	0	–		26	0
Everton	2003–04	Premier League	28	2	1	0	2	0	–		31	2
Everton	2004–05	Premier League	27	0	3	0	3	0	–		33	0
Everton	2005–06	Premier League	29	1	0	0	1	0	4 (Note: Two appearances in UEFA Champions League, two appearances and one goal in UEFA Cup)	1	34	2
Everton	2006–07	Premier League	38	2	1	0	1	0	–		40	2
Everton	2007–08	Premier League	30	1	0	0	2	0	7 (Note: Appearances in UEFA Europa League)	0	39	1
Everton	2008–09	Premier League	27	1	3	0	1	0	2	0	33	1
Everton	2009–10	Premier League	17	1	0	0	0	0	6	1	23	2
Everton	Total		196	8	8	0	10	0	19	2	233	10
Fenerbahçe (loan)	2010–11	Süper Lig	30	1	3	0	–		–		33	1
Fenerbahçe (loan)	2011–12	Süper Lig	39	1	3	0	–		–		42	1
Fenerbahçe (loan)	Total		69	2	6	0	0	0	0	0	75	2
Fenerbahçe	2012–13	Süper Lig	20	0	2	0	0	0	12 (Note: Two appearances in UEFA Champions League, ten appearances in UEFA Europa League)	0	34	0
Fenerbahçe	2013–14	Süper Lig	1	1	1	0	–		3 (Note: Appearances in UEFA Champions League)	0	5	1
Fenerbahçe	Total		21	1	3	0	0	0	15	0	38	1
Norwich City (loan)	2013–14	Premier League	8	0	–		–		–		8	0
Career total			371	13	17	0	12	0	34	2	437	15

=== International ===
Appearances and goals by national team and year
National team	Year	Apps	Goals
Nigeria	2001	7	0
Nigeria	2002	12	0
Nigeria	2003	3	1
Nigeria	2004	10	2
Nigeria	2005	6	0
Nigeria	2006	8	0
Nigeria	2007	4	0
Nigeria	2008	10	2
Nigeria	2009	5	0
Nigeria	2010	10	0
Nigeria	2011	11	2
Nigeria	2012	2	0
Nigeria	2013	6	0
Nigeria	2014	6	0
Nigeria	Total	101	7

List of international goals scored by Joseph Yobo
#	Date	Venue	Opponent	Score	Result	Competition
1.	1 June 2003	Lagos National Stadium, Lagos, Nigeria	Cameroon	1–0	3–0	Friendly
2.	31 January 2004	Stade Mustapha Ben Jannet, Monastir, Tunisia	South Africa	1–0	4–0	2004 African Cup of Nations
3.	3 July 2004	Abuja Stadium, Abuja, Nigeria	Algeria	1–0	1–0	2006 FIFA World Cup qualification
4.	7 June 2008	National Stadium, Freetown, Sierra Leone	Sierra Leone	0–1	0–1	2010 FIFA World Cup qualification
5.	15 June 2008	Estadio de Malabo, Malabo, Equatorial Guinea	Equatorial Guinea	0–1	0–1	2010 FIFA World Cup qualification
6.	5 June 2011	Addis Ababa Stadium, Addis Ababa, Ethiopia	Ethiopia	2–2	2–2	2012 African Cup of Nations qualification
7.	4 September 2011	Mahamasina Stadium, Antananarivo, Madagascar	Madagascar	0–1	0–2	2012 African Cup of Nations qualification

== Honours ==
Everton

- FA Cup runner-up: 2008–09

Fenerbahce

- Süper Lig: 2010–11
- Turkish Cup: 2011–12, 2012–13

Nigeria

- Africa Cup of Nations: 2013

Orders

- Officer of the Order of the Niger: 2013

== See also ==
- List of men's footballers with 100 or more international caps
