= 2002–03 Everton F.C. season =

English football club season

Everton
2002–03 season
- Chairman: Philip Carter
- Manager: David Moyes
- Stadium: Goodison Park
- Premier League: 7th
- FA Cup: Third Round
- League Cup: Fourth Round
- Top goalscorer: League: Tomasz Radzinski (11); All: Kevin Campbell (12)

The 2002-03 Everton F.C. season was Everton's 11th season in the Premier League (known as the Barclaycard Premiership for sponsorship reasons), and their 49th consecutive season in the top division of English football. This meant that they became the first club to play 100 seasons in the top flight.

== Season summary ==
After spending the last few seasons struggling against relegation, Everton, revitalised under David Moyes, spent the season challenging for European qualification, at one stage going ahead of arch-rivals Liverpool, who had finished runners-up the previous season. Everton memorably ended Arsenal's unbeaten run in a match at Goodison Park which saw teenage striker Wayne Rooney score the winner, his debut Premiership goal. Rooney was later nominated for the PFA Young Player of the Year award, but lost to Newcastle United's Jermaine Jenas.

The club had less luck in the FA Cup. They were surprisingly knocked out by Third Division (now League Two) side Shrewsbury Town in the third round.

== Final league table ==
Pos	Team	Pld	W	D	L	GF	GA	GD	Pts	Qualification or relegation
5	Liverpool	38	18	10	10	61	41	+20	64	Qualification for the UEFA Cup first round (Note: Since Liverpool qualified for the UEFA Cup via the league, their place in the UEFA Cup as League Cup winners reverted to the league and was awarded to Blackburn Rovers as the highest-placed team not already qualified for European competitions.)
6	Blackburn Rovers	38	16	12	10	52	43	+9	60	Qualification for the UEFA Cup first round
7	Everton	38	17	8	13	48	49	−1	59	
8	Southampton	38	13	13	12	43	46	−3	52	Qualification for the UEFA Cup first round (Note: Since Arsenal qualified for the Champions League, their place in the UEFA Cup as FA Cup winners went to Southampton, who were the FA Cup runners-up.)
9	Manchester City	38	15	6	17	47	54	−7	51	Qualification for the UEFA Cup qualifying round (Note: Manchester City qualified as the highest-ranked team not already qualified for European competitions of Premiership Fair Play League by The Football Association, the top association among UEFA Fair Play ranking winners.)

Source: Premier League
Rules for classification: 1) points; 2) goal difference; 3) number of goals scored.

== Results ==
Win	Draw	Loss

=== Premier League ===
Date	Opponent	Venue	Result F–A	Scorers	Attendance	Referee	Ref.
17 August 2002	Tottenham Hotspur	Home	2–2	Pembridge 37', Radzinski 81'	40,120	Barry	
24 August 2002	Sunderland	Away	1–0	Campbell 28'	37,698	Styles	
28 August 2002	Birmingham City	Home	1–1	Cunningham 90' (o.g.)	37,197	Wolstenholme	
31 August 2002	Manchester City	Away	1–3	Unsworth 31' (pen.)	34,835	Knight	
11 September 2002	Southampton	Away	0–1		29,190	Bennett	
14 September 2002	Middlesbrough	Home	2–1	Campbell 33', 77'	32,240	Messias	
22 September 2002	Aston Villa	Away	2–3	Radzinski 50', Campbell 65'	30,023	Winter	
28 September 2002	Fulham	Home	2–0	Gravesen 45', Campbell 45'	34,371	Dunn	
7 October 2002	Manchester United	Away	0–3		67,629	Riley	
19 October 2002	Arsenal	Home	2–1	Radzinski 22', Rooney 90'	39,038	Rennie	
27 October 2002	West Ham United	Away	1–0	Carsley 70'	34,117	Wiley	
3 November 2002	Leeds United	Away	1–0	Rooney 80'	40,161	Barry	
9 November 2002	Charlton Athletic	Home	1–0	Radzinski 31'	37,621	Styles	
17 November 2002	Blackburn Rovers	Away	1–0	Campbell 19'	26,496	Poll	
23 November 2002	West Bromwich Albion	Home	1–0	Radzinski 35'	40,113	Winter	
1 December 2002	Newcastle United	Away	1–2	Campbell 17'	51,607	Halsey	
7 December 2002	Chelsea	Home	1–3	Naysmith 44'	39,396	Wolstenholme	
14 December 2002	Blackburn Rovers	Home	2–1	Carsley 12', Rooney 25'	36,578	Barber	
22 December 2002	Liverpool	Away	0–0		44,025	Poll	
26 December 2002	Birmingham City	Away	1–1	Radzinski 45'	29,505	Elleray	
28 December 2002	Bolton Wanderers	Home	0–0		39,480	Gallagher	
1 January 2003	Manchester City	Home	2–2	Watson 6', Radzinski 90'	40,163	D'Urso	
12 January 2003	Tottenham Hotspur	Away	3–4	McBride 10', Watson 58', Radzinski 74'	36,070	Dunn	
18 January 2003	Sunderland	Home	2–1	McBride 51', 57'	37,409	Dowd	
28 January 2003	Bolton Wanderers	Away	2–1	Watson 33', 38'	25,119	Styles	
1 February 2003	Leeds United	Home	2–0	Unsworth 56' (pen.), Radzinski 68'	40,153	Halsey	
8 February 2003	Charlton Athletic	Away	1–2	McBride 69'	26,623	Winter	
22 February 2003	Southampton	Home	2–1	Radzinski 85', 90+2'	36,569	Elleray	
1 March 2003	Middlesbrough	Away	1–1	Watson 23'	32,473	Rennie	
15 March 2003	West Ham United	Home	0–0		40,158	Halsey	
23 March 2003	Arsenal	Away	1–2	Rooney 56'	38,042	Wiley	
6 April 2003	Newcastle United	Home	2–1	Rooney 18', Unsworth 65' (pen.)	40,031	Barry	
12 April 2003	West Bromwich Albion	Away	2–1	Weir 22', Campbell 45'	27,039	Bennett	
19 April 2003	Liverpool	Home	1–2	Unsworth 58' (pen.)	40,162	Durkin	
21 April 2003	Chelsea	Away	1–4	Carsley 77'	40,875	Riley	
26 April 2003	Aston Villa	Home	2–1	Campbell 59', Rooney 90'	40,167	Poll	
3 May 2003	Fulham	Away	0–2		18,385	Barber	
11 May 2003	Manchester United	Home	1–2	Campbell 8'	40,168	Riley	

=== FA Cup ===
Round	Date	Opponent	Venue	Result F–A	Scorers	Attendance	Referee	Ref.
Third round	4 January 2003	Shrewsbury Town	Away	1–2	Alexandersson 60'	7,800	Dunn	

=== League Cup ===
Round	Date	Opponent	Venue	Result F–A	Scorers	Attendance	Referee	Ref.
Second round	1 October 2002	Wrexham	Away	3–0	Campbell 25', Rooney 83', 89'	13,428	Kaye	
Third round	6 November 2002	Newcastle United	Home	3–3 (a.e.t.) (3–2 p)	Campbell 11', Watson 85', Unsworth 112' (pen.)	34,584	Riley	
Fourth round	4 December 2002	Chelsea	Away	1–4	Naysmith 80'	32,322	Durkin	

== First-team squad ==
Note: Flags indicate national team as defined under FIFA eligibility rules; some limited exceptions apply. Players may hold more than one non-FIFA nationality.

No.	Pos.	Nation	Player
1	GK	ENG	Richard Wright
2	DF	ENG	Steve Watson
3	DF	ITA	Alessandro Pistone
4	DF	ENG	Alan Stubbs
5	DF	SCO	David Weir
6	DF	ENG	David Unsworth
7	MF	SWE	Niclas Alexandersson
8	FW	CAN	Tomasz Radzinski
9	FW	ENG	Kevin Campbell
10	FW	SCO	Duncan Ferguson
11	MF	WAL	Mark Pembridge
12	MF	CHN	Li Tie
13	GK	ENG	Steve Simonsen
15	DF	SCO	Gary Naysmith

No.	Pos.	Nation	Player
16	MF	DEN	Thomas Gravesen
17	MF	SCO	Scot Gemmill
18	FW	ENG	Wayne Rooney
20	DF	NGR	Joseph Yobo
22	MF	SWE	Tobias Linderoth
23	MF	BRA	Juliano Rodrigo (on loan from Botafogo)
26	MF	IRL	Lee Carsley
27	DF	ENG	Peter Clarke
28	DF	ENG	Tony Hibbert
29	MF	ENG	Kevin McLeod
30	FW	ENG	Nick Chadwick
31	MF	ENG	Leon Osman
35	GK	ENG	Paul Gerrard

=== Left club during season ===
Note: Flags indicate national team as defined under FIFA eligibility rules; some limited exceptions apply. Players may hold more than one non-FIFA nationality.

No.	Pos.	Nation	Player
14	MF	ISR	Idan Tal (to Rayo Vallecano)
19	FW	USA	Joe-Max Moore (released)
19	FW	USA	Brian McBride (on loan from Columbus Crew)
21	DF	CHN	Li Weifeng (released)

No.	Pos.	Nation	Player
24	DF	EGY	Ibrahim Said (on loan from Al-Ahly)
25	GK	NOR	Espen Baardsen (released)
32	MF	ENG	Keith Southern (to Blackpool)
—	MF	GHA	Alex Nyarko (on loan to Paris Saint-Germain)

== Reserve squad ==
Note: Flags indicate national team as defined under FIFA eligibility rules; some limited exceptions apply. Players may hold more than one non-FIFA nationality.

No.	Pos.	Nation	Player
33	DF	ENG	George Pilkington
34	MF	ENG	Sean O'Hanlon

No.	Pos.	Nation	Player
37	GK	SCO	Iain Turner

== Statistics ==
=== Appearances and goals ===
No.	Pos	Nat	Player	Total		Premier League		FA Cup		League Cup	
No.	Pos	Nat	Player	Apps	Goals	Apps	Goals	Apps	Goals	Apps	Goals
Goalkeepers
1	GK	(England) ENG	Richard Wright	37	0	33	0	1	0	3	0
13	GK	(England) ENG	Steve Simonsen	2	0	2	0	0	0	0	0
35	GK	(England) ENG	Paul Gerrard	2	0	2	0	0	0	0	0
Defenders
3	DF	(Italy) ITA	Alessandro Pistone	17	0	10+5	0	0	0	2	0
4	DF	(England) ENG	Alan Stubbs	38	0	34+1	0	1	0	1+1	0
5	DF	(Scotland) SCO	David Weir	34	1	27+4	1	1	0	2	0
6	DF	(England) ENG	David Unsworth	37	6	32+1	5	1	0	3	1
20	DF	(Nigeria) NGR	Joseph Yobo	26	0	22+2	0	0	0	2	0
27	DF	(England) ENG	Peter Clarke	1	0	0	0	1	0	0	0
28	DF	(England) ENG	Tony Hibbert	25	0	23+1	0	0	0	1	0
Midfielders
2	MF	(England) ENG	Steve Watson	19	6	14+4	5	0	0	0+1	1
7	MF	(Sweden) SWE	Niclas Alexandersson	8	1	4+3	0	0+1	1	0	0
11	MF	(Wales) WAL	Mark Pembridge	22	1	19+2	1	0	0	1	0
12	MF	(China) CHN	Li Tie	33	0	28+1	0	0+1	0	3	0
15	MF	(Scotland) SCO	Gary Naysmith	32	2	24+4	1	1	0	2+1	1
16	MF	(Denmark) DEN	Thomas Gravesen	35	1	30+3	1	1	0	1	0
17	MF	(Scotland) SCO	Scot Gemmill	19	0	10+6	0	1	0	1+1	0
22	MF	(Sweden) SWE	Tobias Linderoth	6	0	2+3	0	0	0	1	0
23	MF	(Brazil) BRA	Rodrigo Beckham	4	0	0+4	0	0	0	0	0
26	MF	(Republic of Ireland) IRL	Lee Carsley	27	3	21+3	3	1	0	2	0
29	MF	(England) ENG	Kevin McLeod	1	0	0	0	0+1	0	0	0
30	MF	(England) ENG	Nick Chadwick	1	0	0+1	0	0	0	0	0
31	MF	(England) ENG	Leon Osman	2	0	0+2	0	0	0	0	0
Forwards
8	FW	(Canada) CAN	Tomasz Radzinski	33	11	27+2	11	1	0	2+1	0
9	FW	(England) ENG	Kevin Campbell	39	12	31+5	10	0	0	3	2
10	FW	(Scotland) SCO	Duncan Ferguson	8	0	0+7	0	0	0	0+1	0
18	FW	(England) ENG	Wayne Rooney	37	8	14+19	6	1	0	2+1	2
Players transferred out during the season
19	FW	(United States) USA	Brian McBride	8	4	7+1	4	0	0	0	0
21	DF	(China) CHN	Li Weifeng	2	0	1	0	0	0	1	0
25	GK	(Norway) NOR	Espen Baardsen	1	0	1	0	0	0	0	0

Last updated: 30 May 2003
