= Thomas Gravesen =

Danish former footballer (born 1976)

Personal information
- Full name: Thomas Gravesen
- Date of birth: 11 March 1976 (age 50)
- Place of birth: Vejle, Denmark
- Position: Midfielder

Youth career
- Vejle

Senior career*
Years	Team	Apps	(Gls)
1995–1997	Vejle	58	(10)
1997–2000	Hamburger SV	74	(6)
2000–2005	Everton	141	(11)
2005–2006	Real Madrid	34	(1)
2006–2008	Celtic	22	(6)
2007–2008	→ Everton (loan)	8	(0)
Total		337	(34)

International career
1995	Denmark U19	3	(0)
1996–1997	Denmark U21	11	(4)
1998–2006	Denmark	66	(5)
- * Club domestic league appearances and goals

Thomas Gravesen (Danish pronunciation: [ˈtsʰʌmæs ˈkʁɑːwəsn̩]; born 11 March 1976) is a Danish former professional footballer who played as a midfielder.

Gravesen played as a professional in Denmark, Germany, England, Spain and Scotland for Vejle Boldklub, Hamburger SV, Everton, Real Madrid and Celtic.

For the Denmark national team, Gravesen was capped 66 times and scored five goals, from his debut in August 1998 until he ended his national team career in September 2006. He represented Denmark at the international Euro 2000, 2002 World Cup and Euro 2004 tournaments.

He is the older brother of footballer Peter Gravesen.

== Club career ==
=== Vejle Boldklub ===
Born in Vejle, Gravesen began his career in 1995 with hometown club Vejle Boldklub (VB) in the Danish Superliga, alongside a handful of youths making it through the VB youth scheme, including good friend Kaspar Dalgas. At VB he played as sweeper and defensive midfielder, and after he won silver medals in the 1996–97 Superliga season he moved to German team Hamburger SV in 1997.

Gravesen made a total of 94 appearances and six goals in three years with HSV.

=== Everton ===
Following the Euro 2000 tournament, Gravesen went to English club Everton and quickly became a favourite amongst the fans. Gravesen played a key role in Everton's rise toward the top of the 2004–05 Premier League table. With his contract due to expire in the summer of 2005, which would enable him to leave on a free transfer, Everton sold Gravesen to Real Madrid in January 2005 for a surprisingly low fee of £2.5 million.

=== Real Madrid ===
Gravesen was signed to fill a hole in Madrid's defensive midfield, a position somewhat different from his role at Everton. He found immediate playing success at Real Madrid, scoring in one of his first games, a 4–0 win against Espanyol. However, Gravesen would eventually find himself benched. Following public outcry over his tough style of play and the sacking of Real coach Vanderlei Luxemburgo and sporting director Arrigo Sacchi, who were in charge of acquiring Gravesen, he looked ready to leave Real Madrid in the winter transfer window of 2006. However, new coach López Caro would revive Gravesen's career at Real, picking him regularly, using him in the holding role in the new 4–1–4–1 formation Real adopted. Towards the end of the season, Gravesen once again found himself out of the team, and in May 2006 a number of clubs were reported to be interested in him.

In August 2006, a scuffle erupted at a Real Madrid training session following a hard tackle by Gravesen on teammate Robinho. Fabio Capello, the former Real Madrid manager, said about Gravesen: "The way he is, we won't have problems with him. He's just a little bit peculiar. I don't mess with him, he works well tactically. His behaviour is like this, and I don't like it, everything has to be done like he wants it to be done". Gravesen looked likely to leave Real Madrid before the start of the 2006–07 season, with his agent John Sivebæk confirming that a number of clubs – including Newcastle United in England and Scottish club Celtic – were interested in signing the midfielder.

=== Celtic ===
On 28 August 2006, Gravesen attended Celtic Park in Glasgow for a medical examination and, on 30 August, signed a three-year deal (with the option of a fourth) with the club, for a speculated fee of around £2 million. There was a period of uncertainty as to whether Gravesen would sign for Celtic after false rumours arose of a failed medical and of an eleventh-hour bid by Newcastle.

He scored his first goal for Celtic against arch rivals Rangers on 23 September 2006. He then went on to score the first hat-trick of his professional career when Celtic won 3–1 against St Mirren on 12 November. After a promising start to his Celtic career, Gravesen was replaced in the starting line-up by Dutch midfielder Evander Sno. In April 2007, Celtic manager Gordon Strachan denied rumours that Gravesen would leave the club to play for English club Sunderland, but in May 2007 he declared his disappointment that Gravesen did not work harder to recapture his place in the starting line-up.

On 18 August 2008, Celtic and Gravesen parted company.

=== Loan to Everton ===
Gravesen re-signed for Everton on a season-long loan from Celtic on 29 August 2007. On his first game back for Everton, as a second-half substitute in the 2–1 win at Bolton Wanderers, he took the corner that Joleon Lescott headed the winner from. In his first European appearance of the season, in Everton's 3–1 victory over AEL at Goodison Park in the UEFA Cup group stage, Gravesen set up Everton's third goal, scored by Victor Anichebe. However, Gravesen failed to make as big an impact as many Everton fans had hoped. A rare highlight was scoring a penalty in the shootout following the UEFA Cup match against Fiorentina, although Everton would go on to lose the shootout when Phil Jagielka missed the crucial spot-kick. After the last game of the 2007–08 season, manager David Moyes confirmed that Gravesen's contract would not be renewed and he would be returning to Celtic.

=== Retirement ===
On 27 January 2009, Gravesen announced his retirement from professional football after he failed to find a new club after being released by Celtic. On 12 September 2009, he stated in an interview with FourFourTwo that he had been approached by a number of clubs about a possible return to football, but nothing came of these approaches.

It was reported in December 2013 that Gravesen had been successful with investments and was living in Las Vegas.

== International career ==
Gravesen debuted for the Danish national team in a 0–1 friendly match loss to the Czech Republic on 19 August 1998. Gravesen was selected to play for Denmark at the 2000 European Championship (Euro 2000) by coach Bo Johansson, despite concern from Johansson that he was not "psychologically stable" enough.

While at Everton, new Danish national team coach Morten Olsen fully supported Gravesen and made him one of his pivotal players in the 2002 World Cup and Euro 2004 campaigns. His display in the 2002 World Cup qualifying game with Iceland, where Gravesen scored two goals in a 6–0 win, was so impressive that American boxer Mike Tyson asked for his shirt and wore it throughout his stay in Denmark. He played all four of Denmark's matches at the 2002 World Cup, though Gravesen and his partner in the Danish midfield duo, Stig Tøfting, justified their pit bull reputations when they ganged up to play a prank on teammate Jesper Grønkjær at a World Cup training session.

He missed the first group match at Euro 2004 as he was suspended due to a sending off in the last qualifying match before the tournament but he played the remaining three games before Denmark were eliminated.

On 15 September 2006, Gravesen announced his decision to end his international career, deciding now to focus his efforts solely on Celtic.

== Personal life ==
Gravesen previously dated Danish adult film star Kira Eggers. He now lives in a gated community in Los Angeles, with Andre Agassi and Nicolas Cage as two of his neighbours.

== Career statistics ==
=== Club ===
Appearances and goals by club, season and competition
Club	Season	League			National Cup		League Cup		Continental		Total	
Club	Season	Division	Apps	Goals	Apps	Goals	Apps	Goals	Apps	Goals	Apps	Goals
Vejle	1995–96	Danish Superliga	28	2	0	0	–		–		28	2
Vejle	1996–97	Danish Superliga	30	8	0	0	–		–		30	8
Vejle	Total		58	10	0	0	–		–		58	10
Hamburger SV	1997–98	Bundesliga	26	2	1	0	–		–		27	2
Hamburger SV	1998–99	Bundesliga	22	3	2	0	–		–		24	3
Hamburger SV	1999–2000	Bundesliga	26	1	1	0	–		–		27	1
Hamburger SV	Total		74	6	4	0	–		–		78	6
Everton	2000–01	Premier League	32	2	2	0	1	0	–		35	2
Everton	2001–02	Premier League	25	2	1	0	0	0	–		26	2
Everton	2002–03	Premier League	33	1	1	0	1	0	–		35	1
Everton	2003–04	Premier League	30	2	3	0	3	0	–		36	2
Everton	2004–05	Premier League	21	4	1	0	1	0	–		23	4
Everton	Total		141	11	8	0	6	0	–		155	11
Real Madrid	2004–05	La Liga	17	1	1	0	–		2 (Note: Appearances in UEFA Champions League)	0	20	1
Real Madrid	2005–06	La Liga	17	0	6	0	–		6	0	29	0
Real Madrid	Total		34	1	7	0	–		8	0	49	1
Celtic	2006–07	Scottish Premier League	22	6	1	0	0	0	6	0	29	6
Everton (loan)	2007–08	Premier League	8	0	1	0	1	0	3 (Note: Appearances in UEFA Cup)	0	13	0
Career total			337	34	21	0	8	0	17	0	441	61

=== International ===
Appearances and goals by national team and year
National team	Year	Apps	Goals
Denmark	1998	3	0
Denmark	1999	2	0
Denmark	2000	8	0
Denmark	2001	6	2
Denmark	2002	12	0
Denmark	2003	10	3
Denmark	2004	11	0
Denmark	2005	8	0
Denmark	2006	6	0
Total		66	5

Scores and results list Denmark's goal tally first, score column indicates score after each Gravesen goal.

List of international goals scored by Thomas Gravesen
#	Date	Venue	Opponent	Score	Result	Competition
1	6 October 2001	Copenhagen, Denmark	Iceland	3–0	6–0	2002 World Cup qualifier
2	6 October 2001	Copenhagen, Denmark	Iceland	4–0	6–0	2002 World Cup qualifier
3	29 March 2003	Bucharest, Romania	Romania	2–2	5–2	Euro 2004 qualifier
4	30 April 2003	Copenhagen, Denmark	Ukraine	1–0	1–0	Friendly match
5	11 June 2003	Luxembourg City, Luxembourg	Luxembourg	2–0	2–0	Euro 2004 qualifier

== Honours ==
Celtic

- Scottish Premier League: 2006–07
- Scottish Cup: 2006–07
