= Stephen Connor =

English footballer

Personal information
- Date of birth: 27 January 1989 (age 37)
- Place of birth: Wirral, England
- Position: Winger

Youth career
- Everton

Senior career*
Years	Team	Apps	(Gls)
2004–2008	Everton	0	(0)
2007–2008	→ Partick Thistle (loan)	1	(0)
2009	The New Saints		
2009	Bangor City		
2012	Airbus UK Broughton		
2012–2013	Conwy Borough		
2013–	Colwyn Bay		
- Brymbo
- Ruthin Town

International career^{‡}
	England U17	4	(0)
- * Club domestic league appearances and goals as of 16 May 2008 ‡ National team caps and goals as of 16 May 2008

Stephen Connor (born 27 January 1989) is an English former footballer. He played for Partick Thistle whilst on loan from Premier League side Everton, and continued his career playing for a number of Welsh Premier League clubs including The New Saints, Bangor City and Airbus UK Broughton. His usual position was on the wing, but he also played as a striker.

A diminutive winger, Connor has established himself in the Everton Under 18 side and was a regular in the reserve team. In the summer of 2007, Connor signed for Scottish First Division side Partick Thistle on a six-month loan deal. He made his debut as a substitute in a 1–1 draw with Stirling Albion on 4 August. His spell at Partick was blighted by injury. On 15 May 2008 it was announced Everton would not be renewing his contract.

He subsequently moved into the Welsh league system joining The New Saints in January 2009 and made his debut for Bangor City in October that year. In August 2012 he joined Airbus UK Broughton. In November 2012 he moved to Conwy Borough.

In May 2013 he moved to Colwyn Bay.

In July 2020 he was appointed first team coach by Ruthin Town and later served as the club's Assistant Manager between June 2022 and August 2023. Between September 2023 and May 2024 he worked for Oldham Athletic as a youth team coach. In June 2024 he took up a role as Technical Coach for Flint Mountain.

== International career ==
Connor represented the England U17 team in the 2005 Nordic Tournament.
