= Patrizio Pascucci =

Italian footballer

Personal information
- Date of birth: 25 November 1985 (age 40)
- Place of birth: Rome, Italy
- Position: Striker

Youth career
- -2003: Lazio
- 2003-2004: Everton

Senior career*
Years	Team	Apps	(Gls)
2002	→ L'Aquila (loan)	2	(0)
- Sora
2006	Baulmes		(2)
- Boreale Don Orione
- Sporting Genzano
- Cavese
- Sporting Genzano
- * Club domestic league appearances and goals

Patrizio Pascucci (born 25 November 1985) is an Italian former footballer who is last known to have played as a striker for Sporting Genzano.

== Career ==
In 2002, Pascucci was sent on loan to L'Aquila in the Italian third division from the youth academy of Italian Serie A side Lazio.

In 2003, he joined the youth academy of Everton in the English Premier League, before joining Italian third division club Sora, where he received a 2-month ban for throwing a ball at a linesman.

In 2006, Pascucci signed for Baulmes in the Swiss second division before joining Italian sixth division team Boreale Don Orione.
