= Li Tie =

Chinese footballer (born 1977)

Li Tie 李铁
Personal information
- Date of birth: 18 May 1977 (age 49)
- Place of birth: Shenyang, Liaoning, China
- Height: 1.83 m (6 ft 0 in)
- Position: Defensive midfielder

Youth career
- 1992–1998: Liaoning FC
- 1993–1998: → Shenzhen Jianlibao (loan)

Senior career*
Years	Team	Apps	(Gls)
1998–2003	Liaoning FC	82	(2)
2002–2003	→ Everton (loan)	29	(0)
2003–2006	Everton	5	(0)
2006–2008	Sheffield United	0	(0)
2008	Chengdu Blades	24	(1)
2009–2011	Liaoning Whowin	46	(1)
Total		186	(4)

International career
1995–2007	China	92	(6)

Managerial career
- 2015–2016: Hebei China Fortune
- 2017–2019: Wuhan Zall
- 2020–2021: China
Medal record
Men's football
Representing China
Asian Games
Bronze medal – third place	1998 Bangkok	Football
- * Club domestic league appearances and goals

Li Tie (simplified Chinese: 李铁; traditional Chinese: 李鐵; pinyin: Lǐ Tiě; born 18 May 1977) is a Chinese former professional football coach and player.

A defensive midfielder, he represented Liaoning FC in the Chinese Jia-A League, Everton in the Premier League, Sheffield United in the Football League Championship and Chengdu Blades in the Chinese Super League. At international level, he made 92 appearances scoring six goals for the China national team. He was chosen for the AFC Asian Cup in 2000 and 2007, and for the 2002 FIFA World Cup.

After retirement from playing, he started his coaching career as an assistant coach at Guangzhou Evergrande. He moved to the China national team and then Hebei China Fortune where he gained his first coaching position. In 2024, he was sentenced to 20 years in prison for bribery.

== Club career ==
=== Liaoning FC ===
Li Tie began his football career at the age of fifteen, joining Liaoning's youth academy system in 1992. The following year, he was sent to Brazil for a five-year training programme sponsored by Jianlibao and became the captain of the newly organized youth football team. Li started his professional career by playing for Liaoning FC and rose to prominence during the 1999 league season when Liaoning finished as runners-up within the league.

=== Everton ===
One of the highest regarded Chinese players of his generation, Li secured a loan transfer in a deal brokered between sponsor Kejian and Premier League side Everton in August 2002. Despite initial skepticism on Merseyside, his first season as an Everton player was a surprising success. Then manager David Moyes played him in twenty-nine league games and started him in most of his appearances where his displays, as a defensive midfielder helped the club achieve a seventh-place finish during the 2002–03 season.

Following Li's successful loan spell, Everton battled with his former club Liaoning to sign him on a permanent basis after the 2002–03 season and the deal was finally negotiated on 12 August 2003 when Li signed a three-year contract. Everton paid £1,200,000 for his transfer with two-thirds of the deal paid by sponsorships. The club's ownership let him move to the Premier League despite higher offers from Chinese clubs. At the beginning of the 2003–04 season, Li's start was marred by a sending off against Arsenal on 16 August 2003 after only been substituted on for David Unsworth. A series of injuries followed which meant that Li only played five league matches that season. The last injury, a broken leg picked up during international duty in February 2004, ruled him out for another twelve months. In January 2005, when Li made his return to the pitch by playing for Everton's reserve side against Bolton Wanderers, he lasted just forty-one minutes and required his leg to be reassessed.

In the summer of 2005, eighteen months since his last game for the Everton first team, Li played the full match against FC Gamlitz in a pre-season friendly. He made a number of other preseason appearances and looked as if he was finally coming back to full fitness. However, he never managed to break back into the first team despite playing regularly for the reserves and even earning another international call-up for the Chinese national team. In March 2006, Li underwent another operation to remove pieces of bone that had grown on his ankle during his time on the sidelines.

=== Sheffield United ===
In May 2006, Li was released by Everton and Sheffield United announced his signing on a free transfer in July 2006, agreeing to a two-year contract. Following his move, Li spent some time training with China League One side Chengdu Blades, which was owned by Sheffield United, while waiting for his visa clearance. On 19 September 2006, Li made his first competitive club start since January 2004 by appearing for Sheffield United in a League Cup match against Bury. However, Li did not make another appearance for Sheffield United afterwards due to his lingering injury.

On 12 October 2007, Li was told he could leave Sheffield United on a free transfer, with then manager Bryan Robson saying: "He's not in my plans and he is free to go wherever he wants on a free transfer." Only two days later though, Sheffield United changed their mind on the decision and stated that he would stay at the club until the end of the season before having his future evaluated.

=== Back to China ===
Despite reassurances to the contrary, Li did indeed move in 2008, transferring to Sheffield United's affiliated club Chengdu Blades to reinforce the team after their promotion to the Chinese Super League and made his debut in the opening game of the 2008 season against his former club Liaoning Whowin. He scored first league goal in his football career in a 3–1 win against Shenzhen Shangqingyin in October 2008.

After spending one season with Chengdu, Li decided to return to his hometown club Liaoning Whowin to help them in their promotion push back to the top tier. It proved to be an immediate success when he guided them to the securing the second-tier league title and being promoted back to the top flight after only one season. He suffered an injury in October 2010 which ruled him out for the whole 2011 season. After not fully recovering from his leg injury, Li announced that he had decided to retire from football at the end of the 2011 season.

== International career ==
Li was one of four players called up from the Shenzhen Youth for the final round of 1998 FIFA World Cup qualifiers by Qi Wusheng, along with Li Jinyu, Sui Dongliang, and Zhang Xiaorui. He was chosen for the 2002 FIFA World Cup, the nation's debut in the tournament.

Recovering from an injury, Li returned to competitive football in June 2006 with substitute appearances for the China national team against Switzerland and France. He was once again called up to play for the national team in a friendly against Thailand on 10 August 2006 and in a 2007 AFC Asian Cup qualifier against Singapore on 16 August 2006. Li remained as a part of the national side and was called up by Zhu Guanghu to play the 2007 AFC Asian Cup, but failed to make an appearance during the tournament.

== Managerial career ==
On 25 May 2012, Li accepted an invitation from Guangzhou Evergrande manager Marcello Lippi to become one of his assistant coaches. He also became the assistant coach of the Chinese national team under Alain Perrin in May 2014. He resigned from his position as assistant coach on 26 June 2015 after about three seasons with Guangzhou. Li became the deputy general manager, sports director and assistant coach at China League One side Hebei China Fortune on 14 July 2015. On 18 August 2015, he was assigned as the manager of the club after Radomir Antić's departure. Li led the club to win promotion to Chinese Super League in the 2015 season by winning eight matches in the rest of nine and finishing the runners-up in the league. On 27 August 2016, Li was replaced by Manuel Pellegrini after winning just one match in the last nine matches.

On 16 November 2017, Li was appointed as the head coach of China League One club Wuhan Zall. In the 2018 season, he led the club to the Chinese Super after a five-year absence, being confirmed as champions and achieving promotion with three matches remaining in the season.

He acted as caretaker coach of Chinese national team following the resignation of Marcello Lippi in 2019. On 2 January 2020, Li was appointed as the new manager of China. On 3 December 2021, Li was replaced by fellow 2002 World Cup teammate Li Xiaopeng.

== Corruption conviction ==
On 26 November 2022, Li was placed under investigation for "serious violations of laws" by the Central Commission for Discipline Inspection (CCDI), the party's internal disciplinary body, and the National Supervisory Commission, the highest anti-corruption agency of China. He was put on trial for "accepting and offering bribes" while manager of the Chinese national team and for being involved in match-fixing while manager of Hebei China Fortune and Wuhan Zall. He confessed, and on 13 December 2024 was sentenced to 20 years in prison. On 29 January 2026, he was given a lifetime ban for match-fixing by the Chinese Football Association.

== Career statistics ==
=== Club ===
Appearances and goals by club, season and competition
Club	Season	League			National cup (Note: Includes Chinese FA Cup, FA Cup)		League cup (Note: Includes CSL Cup, Football League Cup)		Continental		Total	
Club	Season	Division	Apps	Goals	Apps	Goals	Apps	Goals	Apps	Goals	Apps	Goals
Liaoning FC	1999	Chinese Jia-A League	24	0			–		–		24	0
Liaoning FC	2000	Chinese Jia-A League	25	0			–		–		25	0
Liaoning FC	2001	Chinese Jia-A League	26	0	0	0	–		–		26	0
Liaoning FC	2002	Chinese Jia-A League	7	0	0	0	–		–		7	0
Liaoning FC	Total		82	2	0	0	0	0	0	0	82	0
Everton	2002-03	Premier League	29	0	1	0	3	0	0	0	33	0
Everton	2003-04	Premier League	5	0	0	0	2	0	0	0	7	0
Everton	2004-05	Premier League	0	0	0	0	0	0	0	0	0	0
Everton	2005-06	Premier League	0	0	0	0	0	0	0	0	0	0
Everton	Total		34	0	1	0	5	0	0	0	40	0
Sheffield United	2006-07	Premier League	0	0	0	0	1	0	–		1	0
Sheffield United	2007-08	English Championship	0	0	0	0	0	0	–		0	0
Sheffield United	Total		0	0	0	0	1	0	0	0	1	0
Chengdu Blades	2008	Chinese Super League	24	1	–		–		–		24	1
Liaoning Whowin	2009	China League One	22	1	–		–		–		22	1
Liaoning Whowin	2010	Chinese Super League	24	0	–		–		–		24	0
Liaoning Whowin	2011	Chinese Super League	0	0	0	0	–		–		0	0
Liaoning Whowin	Total		46	1	0	0	0	0	0	0	46	1
Career total			186	4	1	0	6	0	0	0	193	4

=== International ===
Scores and results list China's goal tally first, score column indicates score after each Li goal.

List of international goals scored by Li Tie
No.	Date	Venue	Opponent	Score	Result	Competition
1	29 January 1997	Kunming Tuodong Sports Center, Kunming, China	United States	2–0	2–1	Friendly
2	20 April 1997	Workers' Stadium, Beijing, China	Myanmar	?–0	5–0	Friendly
3	14 January 2000	Tianhe Stadium, Guangzhou, China	New Zealand	1–0	1–0	2000 Four Nations Tournament
4	23 January 2000	Thong Nhat Stadium, Ho Chi Minh City, Vietnam	Philippines	8–0	8–0	2000 AFC Asian Cup qualification
5	26 January 2000	Thong Nhat Stadium, Ho Chi Minh City, Vietnam	Guam	14–0	19–0	2000 AFC Asian Cup qualification
6	14 February 2001	National Stadium, Bangkok, Thailand	Thailand	5–1	5–1	2001 King's Cup

== Managerial statistics ==
As of 11 November 2021

Team	From	To	Record				
Team	From	To	G	W	D	L	Win %
Hebei China Fortune	18 August 2015	27 August 2016	36	20	6	10	55.56
Wuhan Zall	16 November 2017	1 January 2020	62	31	17	14	50.00
China	31 October 2019	3 December 2021	12	6	1	5	50.00
Total			110	57	24	29	51.82

== Honours ==
=== Player ===
Liaoning Whowin

- China League One: 2009
- Chinese FA Super Cup: 1999

Individual

- Chinese Jia-A League Team of the Year: 1999, 2001

=== Manager ===
Wuhan Zall

- China League One: 2018

Individual

- China League One Coach of the Year: 2018
