= Tomasz Radzinski =

Polish-born soccer player (born 1973)

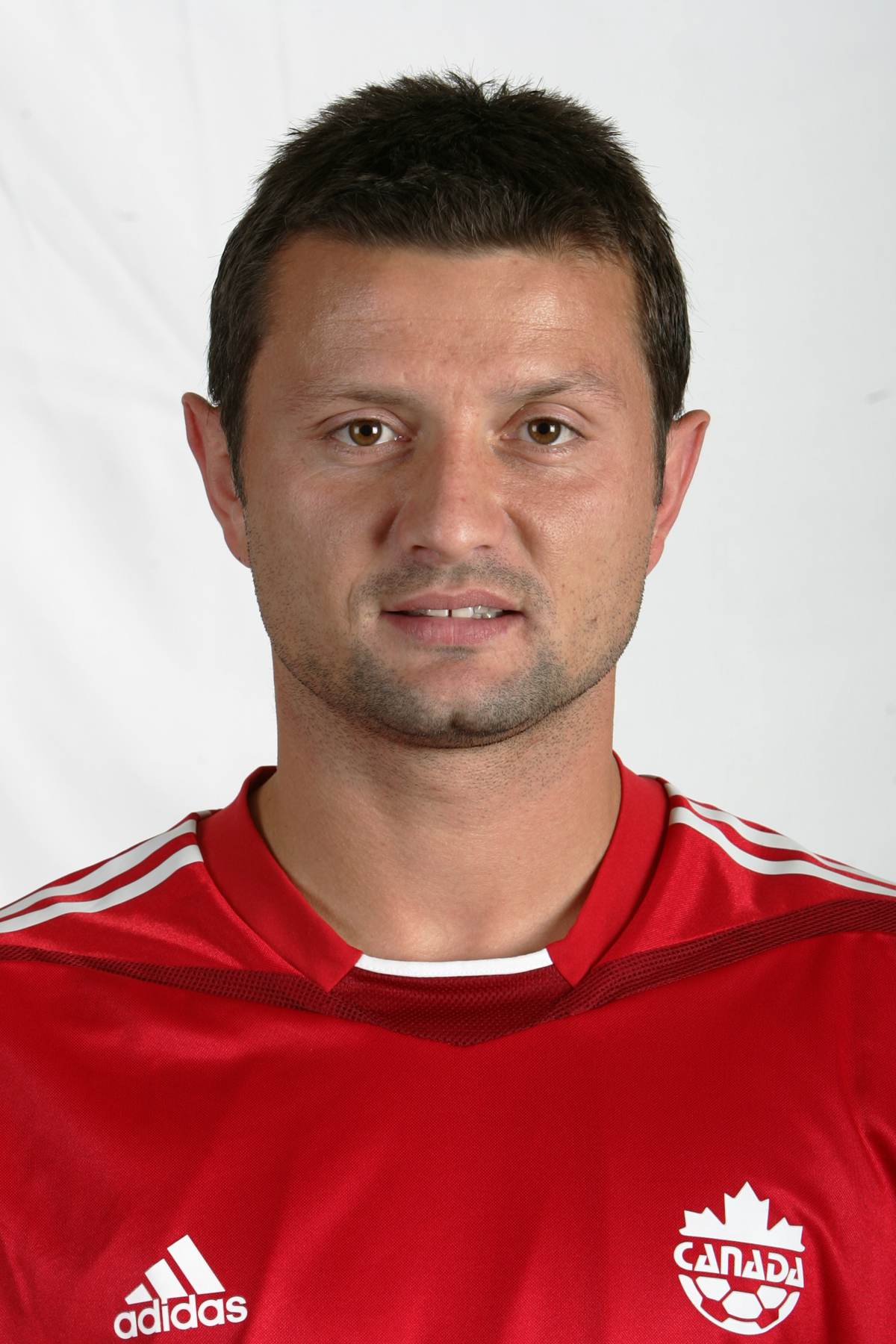
- Radzinski with Canada in 2004

Personal information
- Date of birth: 14 December 1973 (age 52)
- Place of birth: Poznań, Poland
- Height: 1.74 m (5 ft 9 in)
- Positions: Striker; winger

Youth career
- Cuiavia Inowrocław
- 1987–1990: VfL Osnabrück

Senior career*
Years	Team	Apps	(Gls)
1990–1993	North York Rockets	32	(7)
1994	St. Catharines Wolves	–	(–)
1994–1998	Germinal Ekeren	104	(42)
1998–2001	Anderlecht	77	(52)
2001–2004	Everton	91	(25)
2004–2007	Fulham	103	(11)
2007–2008	Skoda Xanthi	25	(14)
2008–2012	Lierse	86	(39)
2012	Waasland-Beveren	14	(7)
Total		500	(190)

International career
1994	Canada U23	3	(0)
1995–2009	Canada	46	(10)

Managerial career
- 2013–2015: Lierse (sporting director)
- * Club domestic league appearances and goals

Tomasz Radzinski (born 14 December 1973) is a former professional soccer player who played as a striker and winger. He featured for clubs including North York Rockets in Canada, Germinal Ekeren, Anderlecht (where he won the national championship twice), Lierse and Waasland-Beveren in Belgium, Everton and Fulham in England and Skoda Xanthi in Greece. Born in Poland, he represented Canada at international level having moved there as a teenager, receiving 46 full caps between 1995 and 2009.

== Club career ==
Prior to his moving to Canada, Radziński began his playing career as a youth with Cuiavia Inowrocław in his native Poland, and Germany's VfL Osnabrück. He joined the North York Rockets of the Canadian Soccer League in 1990 and remained with the club through the league's demise in 1992 to the club's last year, played in the National Soccer League (NSL), in 1993. He played in the summer of 1994 with the St. Catharines Wolves (of the same league which however was by then renamed to the Canadian National Soccer League).

Radziński returned to Europe, joining Germinal Ekeren in Belgium in 1994. From there he eventually signed for Belgian giants Anderlecht for whom he scored 57 goals in 90 appearances – including five UEFA Champions League strikes in his last season with the Belgian champions – before moving to Everton for around £4.5 million, the highest transfer fee paid for a Canadian up to that time.

At Everton, Radziński scored 25 times in 91 Premiership outings before requesting a transfer, eventually securing a three-year deal with Fulham F.C. worth £1.75 million. Radzinski wasn't as prolific at Fulham as he was in his previous side, but won over the fans with several crucial goals. Radzinski was released at the end of the 2006–07 season by new manager Lawrie Sanchez, totalling 17 goals in 117 appearances.

On 28 August 2007, he signed for Greek team Skoda Xanthi, on a free transfer.

One year later, on 30 August 2008, he signed a one-year contract for Belgian Second Division club Lierse, although his previous contract was valid until 2010. Lierse first had their eye on Peter Utaka, but when he transferred to Odense, they elected to sign Radzinski. Radzinski had disclosed to the press his belief that members of Skoda Xanthi had been involved in match fixing and was seeking a transfer.

On 29 January 2012, Belgian Second Division side Waasland-Beveren announced they had signed Radzinski on a short-term deal until the end of the 2011–12 season with an option for an additional year.

== International career ==
Radzinski made his debut for the Canada national team in a June 1995 friendly match against Turkey. He earned a total of 46 caps, scoring 10 goals making him tied 9th with Paul Peschisolido in all-time scoring for Canada.

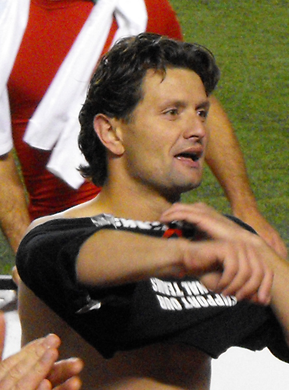
Radzinski after a Canada - Mexico second round World Cup qualifying match at Commonwealth Stadium in Edmonton, Alberta on 16 October 2008.

In October 1999, Radzinski had been called up to the Canada national team by coach Holger Osieck, he promised to attend, failed to turn up and later refused to be interviewed about it. The Canadian Soccer Association approached FIFA to have Radzinski prevented from playing for Anderlecht as a result. Kevan Pipe, the head of the CSA called Radzinski's actions "an insult to his teammates, his coach and the country". In October 2001, he announced that he'd like to play for Canada again as they had a friendly against European opponents, Malta. On 15 June 2002, Radzinski scored two goals in a friendly match against Switzerland in St. Gallen, helping Canada to beat Switzerland 3-1. He has represented Canada in 19 FIFA World Cup qualification matches. in three FIFA World Cup qualification campaigns (1998, 2006 and 2010)

He also holds a Belgian passport through his marriage.

== Post-playing career ==
Radzinski was the technical director of Belgian soccer club Lierse S.K. from 2013 to 2015.

== Career statistics ==
Appearances and goals by national team and year
National team	Year	Apps	Goals
Canada	1995	4	0
Canada	1996	7	1
Canada	1997	2	0
Canada	1998	0	0
Canada	1999	0	0
Canada	2000	0	0
Canada	2001	1	0
Canada	2002	2	2
Canada	2003	3	2
Canada	2004	7	2
Canada	2005	2	0
Canada	2006	4	1
Canada	2007	4	1
Canada	2008	9	1
Canada	2009	1	0
Total		46	10

Scores and results list Canada's goal tally first, score column indicates score after each Radzinski goal.

List of international goals scored by Tomasz Radzinski
No.	Date	Venue	Opponent	Score	Result	Competition
1	12 January 1996	Los Angeles Memorial Coliseum, Los Angeles, United States	Brazil	1–3	1–4	1996 Gold Cup
2	15 May 2002	Espenmoos, St. Gallen, Switzerland	Switzerland	1–0	3–1	Friendly
3	15 May 2002	Espenmoos, St. Gallen, Switzerland	Switzerland	3–0	3–1	Friendly
4	11 October 2003	Ratina Stadium, Tampere, Finland	Finland	1–3	2–3	Friendly
5	15 November 2003	Na Stínadlech, Teplice, Czech Republic	Czech Republic	1–5	1–5	Friendly
6	13 June 2004	Richardson Memorial Stadium, Kingston, Canada	Belize	2–0	4–0	2006 World Cup qualification
7	16 June 2004	Richardson Memorial Stadium, Kingston, Canada	Belize	1–0	4–0	2006 World Cup qualification
8	8 October 2006	National Stadium, Kingston, Jamaica	Jamaica	1–0	1–2	Friendly
9	25 March 2007	Bermuda National Stadium, Hamilton, Bermuda	Bermuda	2–0	3–0	Friendly
10	15 October 2008	Commonwealth Stadium, Edmonton, Canada	Mexico	2–1	2–2	2010 World Cup qualifier

== Honours ==
Germinal Ekeren

- Belgian Cup: 1996–97

Anderlecht

- Belgian First Division: 1999–2000, 2000–01
- Belgian Super Cup: 2000

Lierse

- Belgian Second Division: 2009–10

Individual

- Canada Soccer Player of the Year: 1998
- Belgian First Division Top Scorer: 2000–01
- Canada Soccer Hall of Fame: 2018
