= 2005–06 Everton F.C. season =

English football club season

Everton
2005–06 season
- Chairman: Bill Kenwright
- Manager: David Moyes
- Premier League: 11th
- FA Cup: Fourth Round
- League Cup: Third Round
- Champions League: Third Qualifying Round
- UEFA Cup: First Round
- Top goalscorer: League: James Beattie (10); All: James Beattie (11)
- Average home league attendance: 36,860
Home colours	Away colours	Third colours

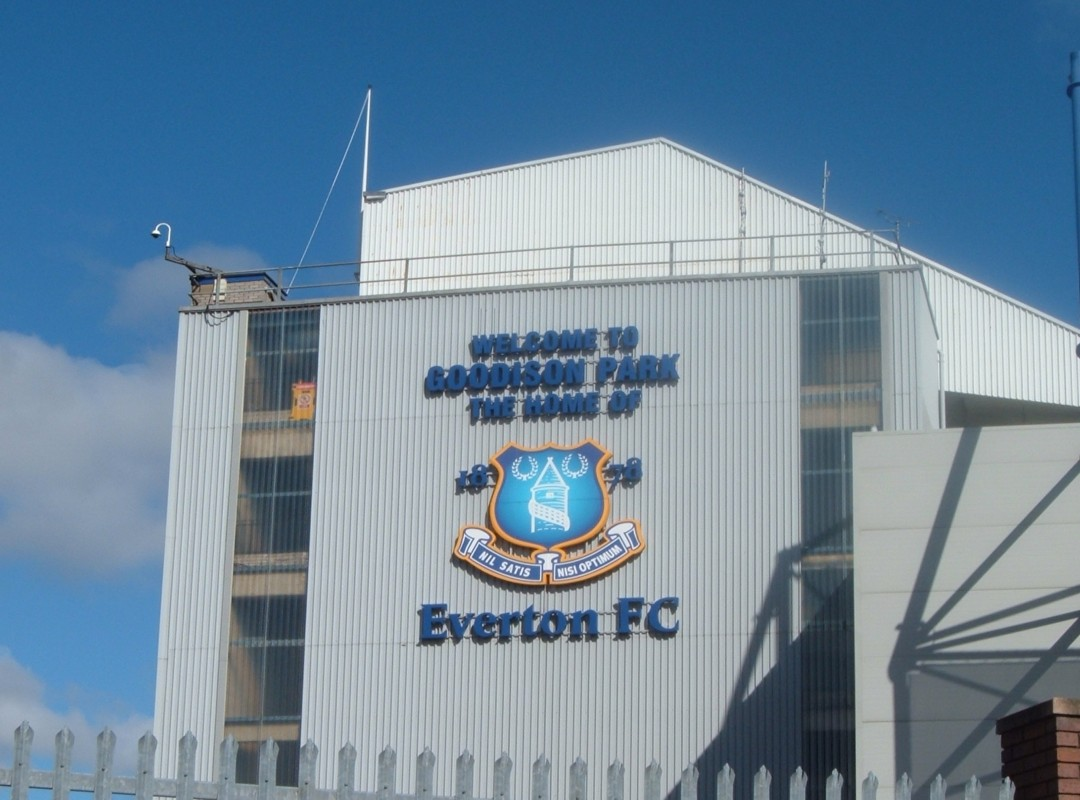
Goodison Park

During the 2005–06 season, Everton competed in the Premier League.

== Season summary ==
Despite finishing in the coveted fourth place last season, Everton suffered a downturn this season. Failure to qualify for the Champions League and an early exit from the UEFA Cup took their toll on player morale, and at the end of October the Toffees stood in the relegation zone. The club eventually rallied to secure a safe eleventh place in the final table – not high enough for any further European adventures the next season, and somewhat disappointing for a side which had achieved so much last season.

The end of the season saw the retirement of Scottish striker Duncan Ferguson, the highest scoring Scotsman ever in the Premier League's history.

== Final league table ==
Pos	Team	Pld	W	D	L	GF	GA	GD	Pts	Qualification or relegation
9	West Ham United	38	16	7	15	52	55	−3	55	Qualification for the UEFA Cup first round (Note: Since Liverpool had already qualified for the Champions League, their UEFA Cup berth as the FA Cup winners went to West Ham, who were the FA Cup runners-up.)
10	Wigan Athletic	38	15	6	17	45	52	−7	51	
11	Everton	38	14	8	16	34	49	−15	50	
12	Fulham	38	14	6	18	48	58	−10	48	
13	Charlton Athletic	38	13	8	17	41	55	−14	47	

Source: Premier League
Rules for classification: 1) points; 2) goal difference; 3) number of goals scored.

== Results ==
Everton's score comes first

=== Legend ===
Win	Draw	Loss

=== FA Premier League ===
Round	1	2	3	4	5	6	7	8	9	10	11	12	13	14	15	16	17	18	19	20	21	22	23	24	25	26	27	28	29	30	31	32	33	34	35	36	37	38
Ground	H	A	A	H	A	H	A	A	H	A	H	A	H	A	A	H	H	A	H	A	H	A	H	A	H	H	A	A	H	H	A	H	A	H	A	H	A	H
Result	L	W	L	L	L	L	L	L	D	W	W	L	W	W	D	L	L	L	L	W	W	W	W	D	W	W	L	D	W	W	L	D	D	L	L	D	W	D
Position	18	11	13	16	18	19	20	20	20	20	18	16	18	16	16	15	16	16	17	16	16	14	12	12	12	11	12	12	11	9	10	10	11	11	12	12	11	11

Updated to match(es) played on 7 May 2006 (end of season). Source: worldfootball.net
A = Away; H = Home; W = Win; D = Draw; L = Loss

Date	Opponent	Venue	Result	Attendance	Scorers
13 August 2005	Manchester United	H	0–2	38,610	
21 August 2005	Bolton Wanderers	A	1–0	25,608	Bent
27 August 2005	Fulham	A	0–1	17,169	
10 September 2005	Portsmouth	H	0–1	36,831	
19 September 2005	Arsenal	A	0–2	38,121	
24 September 2005	Wigan Athletic	H	0–1	37,189	
2 October 2005	Manchester City	A	0–2	42,681	
15 October 2005	Tottenham Hotspur	A	0–2	36,247	
23 October 2005	Chelsea	H	1–1	36,042	Beattie (pen)
29 October 2005	Birmingham City	A	1–0	26,554	Davies
6 November 2005	Middlesbrough	H	1–0	34,349	Beattie
19 November 2005	West Bromwich Albion	A	0–4	24,784	
27 November 2005	Newcastle United	H	1–0	36,207	Yobo
3 December 2005	Blackburn Rovers	A	2–0	22,064	McFadden, Arteta
11 December 2005	Manchester United	A	1–1	67,831	McFadden
14 December 2005	West Ham United	H	1–2	35,704	Beattie
17 December 2005	Bolton Wanderers	H	0–4	34,500	
26 December 2005	Aston Villa	A	0–4	32,432	
28 December 2005	Liverpool	H	1–3	40,158	Beattie
31 December 2005	Sunderland	A	1–0	30,576	Cahill
2 January 2006	Charlton Athletic	H	3–1	34,333	Beattie, Cahill (2)
14 January 2006	Portsmouth	A	1–0	20,094	O'Brien (own goal)
21 January 2006	Arsenal	H	1–0	36,920	Beattie
31 January 2006	Wigan Athletic	A	1–1	21,731	Thompson (own goal)
4 February 2006	Manchester City	H	1–0	37,827	Weir
11 February 2006	Blackburn Rovers	H	1–0	35,615	Beattie
25 February 2006	Newcastle United	A	0–2	51,916	
4 March 2006	West Ham United	A	2–2	34,866	Osman, Beattie
11 March 2006	Fulham	H	3–1	36,515	Beattie (2, 1 pen), McFadden
18 March 2006	Aston Villa	H	4–1	36,507	McFadden, Cahill (2), Osman
25 March 2006	Liverpool	A	1–3	44,923	Cahill
1 April 2006	Sunderland	H	2–2	38,093	Osman, McFadden
8 April 2006	Charlton Athletic	A	0–0	26,954	
15 April 2006	Tottenham Hotspur	H	0–1	39,856	
17 April 2006	Chelsea	A	0–3	41,765	
22 April 2006	Birmingham City	H	0–0	35,420	
29 April 2006	Middlesbrough	A	1–0	29,224	McFadden
7 May 2006	West Bromwich Albion	H	2–2	39,671	Anichebe, Ferguson

=== FA Cup ===
Round	Date	Opponent	Venue	Result	Attendance	Goalscorers
R3	7 January 2006	Millwall	A	1–1	16,440	Osman
R3R	18 January 2006	Millwall	H	1–0	25,800	Cahill
R4	28 January 2006	Chelsea	H	1–1	29,742	McFadden
R4R	8 February 2006	Chelsea	A	1–4	39,301	Arteta (pen)

=== League Cup ===
Round	Date	Opponent	Venue	Result	Attendance	Goalscorers
R3	25 October 2005	Middlesbrough	H	0–1	25,844	

=== UEFA Champions League ===
Round	Date	Opponent	Venue	Result	Attendance	Goalscorers
QR3 1st Leg	9 August 2005	Villarreal	H	1–2	37,685	Beattie
QR3 2nd Leg	24 August 2005	Villarreal	A	1–2 (lost 2–4 on agg)	22,000	Arteta

=== UEFA Cup ===
Round	Date	Opponent	Venue	Result	Attendance	Goalscorers
R1 1st Leg	15 September 2005	Dinamo București	A	1–5	11,500	Yobo
R1 2nd Leg	29 September 2005	Dinamo București	H	1–0 (lost 2–5 on agg)	21,843	Cahill

== Squad ==
Note: Flags indicate national team as defined under FIFA eligibility rules; some limited exceptions apply. Players may hold more than one non-FIFA nationality.

No.	Pos.	Nation	Player
1	GK	ENG	Richard Wright
3	DF	SCO	Gary Naysmith
4	DF	NGA	Joseph Yobo
5	DF	SCO	David Weir (captain)
6	MF	ESP	Mikel Arteta
8	FW	ENG	James Beattie
9	FW	SCO	Duncan Ferguson
10	MF	WAL	Simon Davies
11	FW	SCO	James McFadden
12	MF	CHN	Li Tie
13	GK	SCO	Iain Turner
14	MF	IRL	Kevin Kilbane
15	DF	ENG	Alan Stubbs
16	MF	IRL	Lee Carsley
17	MF	AUS	Tim Cahill
18	MF	ENG	Phil Neville
19	DF	POR	Nuno Valente
20	DF	ITA	Matteo Ferrari (on loan from Roma)

No.	Pos.	Nation	Player
21	MF	ENG	Leon Osman
22	DF	ENG	Tony Hibbert
23	DF	ITA	Alessandro Pistone
25	GK	ENG	Nigel Martyn
27	MF	NED	Andy van der Meyde
29	FW	ENG	James Vaughan
30	GK	ENG	John Ruddy
31	DF	ENG	Mark Hughes
32	DF	ENG	Stephen Wynne
33	MF	ENG	Christian Sergeant
34	DF	ENG	Sean Wright
35	FW	ENG	Paul Hopkins
36	DF	SCO	Patrick Boyle
37	MF	ENG	Jay Harris
38	FW	NGA	Victor Anichebe
39	MF	ENG	Laurence Wilson
41	MF	ISL	Bjarni Vidarsson

=== Left club during season ===
Note: Flags indicate national team as defined under FIFA eligibility rules; some limited exceptions apply. Players may hold more than one non-FIFA nationality.

No.	Pos.	Nation	Player
2	DF	DEN	Per Krøldrup (to Fiorentina)
7	FW	ENG	Marcus Bent (to Charlton Athletic)

No.	Pos.	Nation	Player
26	GK	NED	Sander Westerveld (on loan from Portsmouth)
28	MF	BRA	Anderson de Silva (on loan to Málaga)

=== Player awards ===
- Player of the Season – Mikel Arteta
- Players' Player of the Season – Mikel Arteta
- Young Player of the Season – James McFadden
- Reserve / U21 Player of the Season – Victor Anichebe
- Academy Player of the Season – Scott Phelan
- Goal of the Season – James Beattie vs. Fulham

== Statistics ==
=== Appearances and goals ===
No.	Pos	Nat	Player	Total		Premier League		FA Cup		League Cup		Europe	
No.	Pos	Nat	Player	Apps	Goals	Apps	Goals	Apps	Goals	Apps	Goals	Apps	Goals
Goalkeepers
1	GK	(England) ENG	Richard Wright	16	0	14+1	0	1	0	0	0	0	0
13	GK	(Scotland) SCO	Iain Turner	4	0	2+1	0	1	0	0	0	0	0
25	GK	(England) ENG	Nigel Martyn	27	0	20	0	2	0	1	0	4	0
30	GK	(England) ENG	John Ruddy	1	0	0+1	0	0	0	0	0	0	0
Defenders
3	DF	(Scotland) SCO	Gary Naysmith	8	0	7	0	0+1	0	0	0	0	0
4	DF	(Nigeria) NGA	Joseph Yobo	34	2	29	1	0	0	1	0	4	1
5	DF	(Scotland) SCO	David Weir	42	1	32+1	1	4	0	1	0	3+1	0
15	DF	(England) ENG	Alan Stubbs	14	0	13+1	0	0	0	0	0	0	0
19	DF	(Portugal) POR	Nuno Valente	26	0	20	0	4	0	0	0	2	0
20	DF	(Italy) ITA	Matteo Ferrari	13	0	6+2	0	3	0	1	0	1	0
22	DF	(England) ENG	Tony Hibbert	38	0	29	0	4	0	1	0	4	0
23	DF	(Italy) ITA	Alessandro Pistone	3	0	2	0	0	0	0	0	1	0
Midfielders
6	MF	(Spain) ESP	Mikel Arteta	37	3	27+2	1	4	1	1	0	3	1
10	MF	(Wales) WAL	Simon Davies	36	1	22+8	1	1+1	0	1	0	3	0
12	MF	(China) CHN	Li Tie	0	0	0	0	0	0	0	0	0	0
14	MF	(Republic of Ireland) IRL	Kevin Kilbane	43	0	21+13	0	4	0	1	0	3+1	0
16	MF	(Republic of Ireland) IRL	Lee Carsley	6	0	3+2	0	0+1	0	0	0	0	0
17	MF	(Australia) AUS	Tim Cahill	39	8	32	6	3	1	0	0	4	1
18	MF	(England) ENG	Phil Neville	43	1	34	0	4	1	1	0	4	0
21	MF	(England) ENG	Leon Osman	42	4	28+7	3	3+1	1	0+1	0	1+1	0
27	MF	(Netherlands) NED	Andy van der Meyde	11	0	7+3	0	0	0	0+1	0	0	0
Forwards
8	FW	(England) ENG	James Beattie	38	11	29+3	10	2+1	0	1	0	1+1	1
9	FW	(Scotland) SCO	Duncan Ferguson	31	1	7+20	1	0	0	0	0	2+2	0
11	FW	(Scotland) SCO	James McFadden	41	7	24+8	6	2+2	1	1	0	2+2	0
29	FW	(England) ENG	James Vaughan	1	0	0+1	0	0	0	0	0	0	0
38	FW	(Nigeria) NGA	Victor Anichebe	3	1	0+2	1	0+1	0	0	0	0	0
Players transferred out during the season
2	DF	(Denmark) DEN	Per Krøldrup	2	0	1	0	0+1	0	0	0	0	0
7	FW	(England) ENG	Marcus Bent	24	1	7+11	1	1	0	0+1	0	2+2	0
26	GK	(Netherlands) NED	Sander Westerveld	2	0	2	0	0	0	0	0	0	0

Last updated: 30 May 2006
Source: Competitions

=== Starting 11 ===
Considering starts in all competitions

- GK: #25, (England) Nigel Martyn, 27
- RB: #22, (England) Tony Hibbert, 38
- CB: #5, (Scotland) David Weir, 40
- CB: #4, (Nigeria) Joseph Yobo, 34
- LB: #18, (England) Phil Neville, 43
- RM: #21, (England) Leon Osman, 32
- CM: #6, (Spain) Mikel Arteta, 35
- CM: #17, (Australia) Tim Cahill, 39
- LM: #14, (Republic of Ireland) Kevin Kilbane, 29
- CF: #8, (England) James Beattie, 33
- CF: #11, (Scotland) James McFadden, 29

== Transfers ==
=== In ===
- (Wales) Simon Davies – (England) Tottenham Hotspur, 26 May 2005, £3,500,000
- (Denmark) Per Krøldrup – (Italy) Udinese, 27 June 2005, £5,000,000
- (Spain) Mikel Arteta – (Spain) Real Sociedad, 15 July 2005, £2,800,000
- (England) Phil Neville – (England) Manchester United, 4 August, £3,500,000
- (Italy) Matteo Ferrari – (Italy) Roma, 26 August 2005, season-long loan
- (Netherlands) Andy van der Meyde – (Italy) Inter Milan, 31 August 2005, £2,000,000
- (England) Alan Stubbs – (England) Sunderland, free, 20 January 2006
- (Netherlands) Sander Westerveld – (England) Portsmouth, 24 February 2006, 28-day loan
- (England) Andrew Johnson – (England) Crystal Palace, 26 May 2006, £3,500,000

=== Out ===
- (England) Alan Stubbs – (England) Sunderland, free, 2 August 2005
- (England) Marcus Bent – (England) Charlton Athletic, 17 January 2006, £2,000,000
- (Denmark) Per Krøldrup – (Italy) Fiorentina, 31 January 2006, £3,600,000
