= John Ruddy =

English footballer (born 1986)

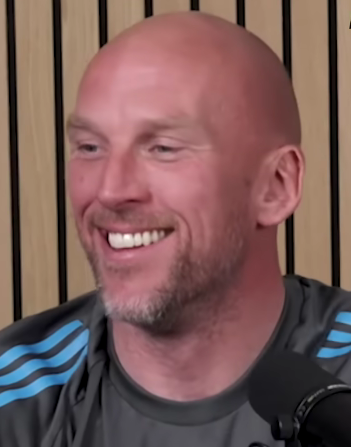
- Ruddy with Newcastle United in 2026

Personal information
- Full name: John Thomas Gordon Ruddy
- Date of birth: 24 October 1986 (age 40)
- Place of birth: St Ives, Cambridgeshire, England
- Height: 6 ft 4 in (1.93 m)
- Position: Goalkeeper

Team information
- Current team: Wolverhampton Wanderers
- Number: 26

Youth career
- –2004: Cambridge United

Senior career*
Years	Team	Apps	(Gls)
2004–2005	Cambridge United	39	(0)
2005–2010	Everton	1	(0)
2005	→ Walsall (loan)	5	(0)
2005	→ Rushden & Diamonds (loan)	3	(0)
2005–2006	→ Chester City (loan)	4	(0)
2006	→ Stockport County (loan)	11	(0)
2007	→ Wrexham (loan)	5	(0)
2007	→ Bristol City (loan)	1	(0)
2008	→ Stockport County (loan)	12	(0)
2009	→ Crewe Alexandra (loan)	19	(0)
2009–2010	→ Motherwell (loan)	34	(0)
2010–2017	Norwich City	235	(0)
2017–2022	Wolverhampton Wanderers	50	(0)
2022–2024	Birmingham City	87	(0)
2024–2026	Newcastle United	0	(0)
2026–	Wolverhampton Wanderers	0	(0)

International career
2012	England	1	(0)
- * Club domestic league appearances and goals as of 12:45, 3 June 2026 (UTC)

John Thomas Gordon Ruddy (born 24 October 1986) is an English professional footballer who plays as a goalkeeper for EFL Championship club Wolverhampton Wanderers.

Ruddy began his career at Cambridge United, before signing for Everton as a 19-year-old. He spent five years with Everton, but made just one appearance, while playing on loan at nine different clubs. Ruddy was signed by Paul Lambert to play for Norwich City in 2010 and, in his first season, was part of the team that finished second in the Championship, gaining promotion to the Premier League.

The following year, Norwich finished twelfth in the Premier League, and Ruddy was selected by new England manager Roy Hodgson for the squad for Euro 2012. However, he was ruled out after breaking a finger during training. He made his debut in a 2–1 win against Italy in August 2012. He suffered a long-term thigh injury in November 2012, but returned to help Norwich to an 11th-place finish at the end of the 2012–13 Premier League season. After 243 appearances for Norwich, he moved to Wolverhampton Wanderers in 2017. After one season as first choice as Wolves gained promotion to the Premier League, he spent four years as backup, and left the club at the end of the 2021–22 season. He then joined Birmingham City, where he spent two years as first-choice goalkeeper before signing for Newcastle United in 2024.

== Early life ==
Ruddy was born in St Ives, Cambridgeshire, where he attended St Ivo School. He grew up as a fan of Manchester United.

== Club career ==
=== Cambridge United ===
Ruddy began his football career at Cambridge United, where his team-mates gave him the nickname "The Iceman". He made his professional debut in the final match of the 2003–04 season at Leyton Orient's Brisbane Road stadium on 8 May 2004, keeping a clean sheet and saving a penalty. Ruddy earned his place as Cambridge's first-choice keeper in the 2004–05 season, making 38 appearances in a season that saw the U's relegated from League Two after finishing bottom with 30 points. This was despite Ruddy's efforts, which included keeping nine clean sheets and conceding just 45 goals.

=== Everton ===
Ruddy had two trials at Manchester United in November 2004, before moving to Everton in the summer of 2005 for a fee of around £250,000 that would rise depending on appearances. He was called into the England Under-19 squad in 2005 after being scouted by England goalkeeping coach Ray Clemence and was touted by his manager David Moyes as a future England goalkeeper.

In September 2005, Ruddy signed for Walsall on loan; he made five appearances in League One before returning to Everton. Loan spells with Rushden & Diamonds and Chester City followed.

Ruddy made his first and only appearance for Everton in February 2006 in unusual circumstances. Nine minutes into the match against Blackburn Rovers, Iain Turner was sent off for handling outside the area. Since Turner was substituting for injured first- and second-choice keepers Nigel Martyn and Richard Wright, it meant that Ruddy was the only keeper left who could play. He kept a clean sheet in a 1–0 victory.

In September 2006, Ruddy went on loan again. A one-month deal was agreed with Stockport County, which was twice extended after some impressive performances. He then agreed a one-month loan with Wrexham in February 2007, but failed to establish a place in the team during his time at the Racecourse Ground and manager Brian Carey decided against extending the loan beyond the initial month. Ruddy spent a week's emergency loan at League One club Bristol City in April, and helped them move closer to promotion, by playing one match – a 3–1 win over Carlisle United. He later joked that he would ask if he were eligible for a runners-up medal as City finished second and won promotion. In January 2009, he went out on loan until the end of the season to Crewe Alexandra.

==== Motherwell (loan) ====
On 24 July 2009, Ruddy joined Scottish Premier League club Motherwell on a six-month loan, to vie with Michael Fraser and Sebastian Kosiorowski for a place in goal. Ruddy kept clean sheets during goalless draws at home to Rangers on 12 September and away to Celtic on 17 October. He also saved a Barry Robson penalty in a 3–2 loss to Celtic on 12 December. When the original loan expired in January 2010, the Fir Park club decided that they wanted to keep Ruddy and fellow Everton loanee Lukas Jutkiewicz for longer; an initial one-month extension was agreed, followed on 27 January by confirmation that both would stay at Motherwell for the rest of the season. Ruddy finished the Scottish Premier League season with 15 clean sheets from 34 appearances.

=== Norwich City ===
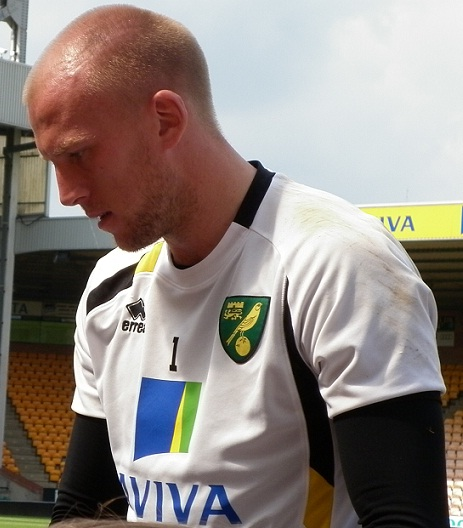
Ruddy training with Norwich City in 2012

On 5 July 2010, Ruddy signed for Championship club Norwich City for an undisclosed fee, which Ruddy revealed in 2017 to have been £250,000. In 2012, Paul Lambert revealed that on two earlier occasions he had considered signing Ruddy for clubs he'd previously managed: "It is funny but ... [we] ... went to watch him for Crewe at MK Dons ... but he had an absolute stinker. We also saw him when he was at Stockport and ... I decided against him at that time, but when Fraser [Forster] went and it was clear we wouldn't be able to get him back again I knew John had had a really good season at Motherwell. There was that clamour to sign Fraser, but with the finances we just couldn't do that. I wanted somebody with the same stature, a big goalkeeper, and John had that."

Ruddy made his debut for City against Watford in the opening fixture of the 2010–11 season which Norwich lost 3–2 at Carrow Road. He kept his first clean sheet of the season in a 1–0 away win against Scunthorpe United on 14 August, followed by another against Swansea City a week later which included a penalty save that atoned for his error that led to it. In Ruddy's first season for Norwich, he played 45 out of the 46 league matches and kept a clean sheet during the 1–0 away win against Portsmouth on 2 May 2011 that confirmed promotion to the Premier League.

Ruddy started the 2011–12 season as the first-choice keeper again for Norwich in the 1–1 draw at the DW Stadium against Wigan Athletic. He followed this up during Norwich's first home Premier League match in seven years, a 1–1 draw against Stoke City, with a penalty stop against Jon Walters and a save denying Matthew Etherington from a direct free kick. During the next match, he received his only red card of the season in the match against Chelsea after a foul on Ramires that led to a penalty. However, Ruddy's fortunes were reversed during the return fixture against Chelsea in January 2012 when he kept his first clean sheet of the season during a 0–0 draw at Carrow Road, making several impressive stops from Fernando Torres and others. Norwich finished in 12th place, and Ruddy was voted Player's Player of the Season, a testament to Ruddy's performances that led to calls for his inclusion in Roy Hodgson's England Euro 2012 squad which were answered in the affirmative.

For the 2012–13 season Ruddy found himself first choice again ahead of Declan Rudd, Jed Steer and newcomer Mark Bunn. Once again, he saved a penalty during Norwich's first home Premier League fixture of the season, a 1–1 draw with Queens Park Rangers, although Bobby Zamora scored from the rebound. He kept clean sheets in 1–0 wins against Arsenal and Manchester United, both during a run of form that saw him keep four clean sheets and concede just two goals in six matches, in the last of which, against his former club, Everton, he suffered a thigh injury. He required surgery and was expected to be out for three months, but was unable to return to action until 12 May 2013, in a 4–0 defeat of West Bromwich Albion that confirmed Norwich's Premier League status for a further season

Ruddy was ever-present in Norwich's league matches throughout the 2013–14 season, at the end of which they were relegated to the Championship, and, despite interest from top-flight clubs, he stayed with Norwich and was ever-present in league matches as they bounced back to the Premier League via the play-offs.

In May 2017, it was announced that Ruddy would be released when his contract expired. All seven players who were being released were given the option of whether or not they chose to be available for selection in the one remaining match of the season. In the end, Ruddy was the only one who played. He was made team captain for the day (he had previously captained the side for one match in the 2013–14 season when Sébastien Bassong and Russell Martin were both absent) and saw out his time with the club by keeping a clean sheet in a 4–0 win over Queens Park Rangers.

=== Wolverhampton Wanderers ===
On 10 July 2017, Ruddy signed a two-year contract with Championship club Wolverhampton Wanderers. His signing came days after the club's previous number one Carl Ikeme was diagnosed with acute leukaemia. On 6 April 2018, Ruddy saved an injury-time penalty from Gary Madine away at Cardiff City in a 1–0 win, in a victory that took Wolves nine points clear of Cardiff. Ruddy became the team's main goalkeeper and was part of the team that won promotion to the Premier League as champions. He was named in the division's PFA Team of the Year and was awarded the EFL's Golden Glove Award for the most clean sheets with 24.

In August 2018 he extended his contract with Wolves, signing a deal due to last until summer 2020, despite having fallen behind new addition Rui Patrício as the club's first-choice goalkeeper. Ahead of its expiry, the club triggered their option to keep him for the 2020–21 season. Playing against Liverpool in March 2021, Patrício collided with his own captain, Conor Coady, and was stretchered off after receiving 15 minutes' treatment on the pitch. Ruddy came on as a concussion substitute and played the remaining few minutes of the game.

On 24 June 2021, Ruddy extended his contract with Wolves once again for the 2021–22 season.

In May 2022, Ruddy said that he would be leaving when his contract expired, after five years with the club.

=== Birmingham City ===
Ruddy signed a one-year contract with Championship club Birmingham City on 14 July 2022. He was expected to provide competition for Neil Etheridge, but went straight into the starting line-up, was ever-present up to the mid-season break, and kept seven clean sheets during that time. In November 2022, his contract was extended to run until the end of the 2023–24 season. He remained ever-present in Championship matches until he strained a thigh during the visit to Millwall on 18 April 2023 and was replaced by Etheridge. Between them, they kept a clean sheet in a 1–0 win that ensured Birmingham's Championship status for a further season. His team-mates voted him Players' Player of the Season for 2022–23.

In his second season, he made 46 appearances in all competitions as Birmingham were relegated to the third tier. The club offered him a new contract which he chose not to accept.

=== Newcastle United ===
On 1 July 2024, Ruddy signed a one-year contract with Premier League club Newcastle United. He made his debut for the club in a preseason friendly against Spanish side Girona at St. James' Park on 9 August, being subbed on in the second-half for Nick Pope.

On 9 June 2025, Newcastle announced that Ruddy would depart the club upon the end of the 2024–25 season. However he later featured on the bench in multiple pre-season friendlies, meaning he in fact signed a new contract without announcement from the club.

On 3 June 2026, the club announced that Ruddy would be leaving after the club decided not to renew his contract.

== International career ==
On 16 May 2012, Ruddy received his first senior international call-up when Roy Hodgson selected him as a member of the England squad for UEFA Euro 2012. However, a broken finger ruled him out of the tournament, and Jack Butland was called up to replace him. Ruddy was called up for the friendly against Italy in Bern, Switzerland, on 10 August 2012, along with Butland and Joe Hart. He came on for Butland at half-time to make his senior England debut, and made some key saves as England won the match 2–1, keeping a clean sheet in his first England appearance after Butland conceded in the first half.

Ruddy was not included in Hodgson's 2014 World Cup squad, with Hart, Fraser Forster, and Ben Foster selected instead. However, he was named on the seven-man standby list.

== Career statistics ==
=== Club ===
As of match played 1 July 2024

Appearances and goals by club, season and competition
Club	Season	League			National cup (Note: Includes FA Cup, Scottish Cup)		League cup (Note: Includes Football League/EFL Cup, Scottish League Cup)		Europe		Other		Total	
Club	Season	Division	Apps	Goals	Apps	Goals	Apps	Goals	Apps	Goals	Apps	Goals	Apps	Goals
Cambridge United	2003–04	Third Division	1	0	0	0	0	0	—		0	0	1	0
Cambridge United	2004–05	League Two	38	0	1	0	1	0	—		2 (Note: Appearance(s) in Football League/EFL Trophy)	0	42	0
Cambridge United	Total		39	0	1	0	1	0	—		2	0	43	0
Everton	2005–06	Premier League	1	0	0	0	0	0	0	0	—		1	0
Everton	2006–07	Premier League	0	0	0	0	—		—		—		0	0
Everton	2007–08	Premier League	0	0	0	0	0	0	0	0	—		0	0
Everton	2008–09	Premier League	0	0	0	0	0	0	0	0	—		0	0
Everton	Total		1	0	0	0	0	0	0	0	—		1	0
Walsall (loan)	2005–06	League One	5	0	—		—		—		—		5	0
Rushden & Diamonds (loan)	2005–06	League Two	3	0	—		—		—		1	0	4	0
Chester City (loan)	2005–06	League Two	4	0	—		—		—		—		4	0
Stockport County (loan)	2006–07	League Two	11	0	—		—		—		—		11	0
Wrexham (loan)	2006–07	League Two	5	0	—		—		—		—		5	0
Bristol City (loan)	2006–07	League One	1	0	—		—		—		—		1	0
Stockport County (loan)	2007–08	League Two	12	0	—		—		—		1 (Note: Appearance in League Two play-offs)	0	13	0
Crewe Alexandra (loan)	2008–09	League One	19	0	—		—		—		—		19	0
Motherwell (loan)	2009–10	Scottish Premier League	34	0	1	0	2	0	2 (Note: Appearances in UEFA Europa League)	0	—		39	0
Norwich City	2010–11	Championship	45	0	0	0	1	0	—		—		46	0
Norwich City	2011–12	Premier League	37	0	0	0	0	0	—		—		37	0
Norwich City	2012–13	Premier League	15	0	0	0	0	0	—		—		15	0
Norwich City	2013–14	Premier League	38	0	0	0	0	0	—		—		38	0
Norwich City	2014–15	Championship	46	0	1	0	0	0	—		3 (Note: Appearances in Championship play-offs)	0	50	0
Norwich City	2015–16	Premier League	27	0	1	0	0	0	—		—		28	0
Norwich City	2016–17	Championship	27	0	0	0	2	0	—		—		29	0
Norwich City	Total		235	0	2	0	3	0	—		3	0	243	0
Wolverhampton Wanderers	2017–18	Championship	45	0	0	0	0	0	—		—		45	0
Wolverhampton Wanderers	2018–19	Premier League	1	0	6	0	2	0	—		—		9	0
Wolverhampton Wanderers	2019–20	Premier League	0	0	2	0	2	0	2	0	—		6	0
Wolverhampton Wanderers	2020–21	Premier League	2	0	3	0	1	0	—		—		6	0
Wolverhampton Wanderers	2021–22	Premier League	2	0	2	0	2	0	—		—		6	0
Wolverhampton Wanderers	Total		50	0	13	0	7	0	2	0	—		72	0
Wolverhampton Wanderers U21	2020–21	—	—		—		—		—		1	0	1	0
Wolverhampton Wanderers U21	2021–22	—	—		—		—		—		1	0	1	0
Wolverhampton Wanderers U21	Total		—		—		—		—		2	0	2	0
Birmingham City	2022–23	Championship	43	0	0	0	0	0	—		—		43	0
Birmingham City	2023–24	Championship	44	0	2	0	0	0	—		—		46	0
Birmingham City	Total		87	0	2	0	0	0	—		—		89	0
Newcastle United	2024–25	Premier League	0	0	0	0	0	0	—		—		0	0
Newcastle United	2025–26	Premier League	0	0	0	0	0	0	0	0	—		0	0
Newcastle United	Total		0	0	0	0	0	0	0	0	—		0	0
Wolverhampton Wanderers	2026–27	Championship	0	0	0	0	0	0	—		—		0	0
Career total			506	0	19	0	13	0	4	0	9	0	551	0

=== International ===
As of match played 15 August 2012

Appearances and goals by national team and year
National team	Year	Apps	Goals
England	2012	1	0
Total		1	0

== Personal life ==
Ruddy married his wife Laura on 2 June 2012. Prior to the Euro 2012 tournament, he jokingly cited breaking his finger as the reason he was able to have his wedding on that date. They have two children.

In December 2015, video footage was revealed to show Ruddy in a late-night altercation with an unknown man; Ruddy punched the man, who fell to the ground. Norwich City Football Club refused to comment, but stated that they would conduct an investigation.

== Honours ==
Norwich City

- Football League Championship runner-up: 2010–11
- Football League Championship play-offs: 2015

Wolverhampton Wanderers

- EFL Championship: 2017–18

Newcastle United

- EFL Cup: 2024–25

Individual

- Norwich City Players' Player of the Season: 2011–12
- EFL Championship Team of the Season: 2017–18
- EFL Team of the Season: 2017–18
- PFA Team of the Year: 2017–18 Championship
- EFL Championship Golden Glove: 2017-18
- Birmingham City Players' Player of the Season: 2022–23
