= 2006–07 Everton F.C. season =

English football club season

Everton
2006–07 season
- Manager: David Moyes
- Stadium: Goodison Park
- FA Premier League: 6th
- FA Cup: Third Round
- League Cup: Fourth Round
- Top goalscorer: League: Andy Johnson (11); All: Andy Johnson (12)
- Average home league attendance: 36,739
| Home colours | Away colours | Third colours |

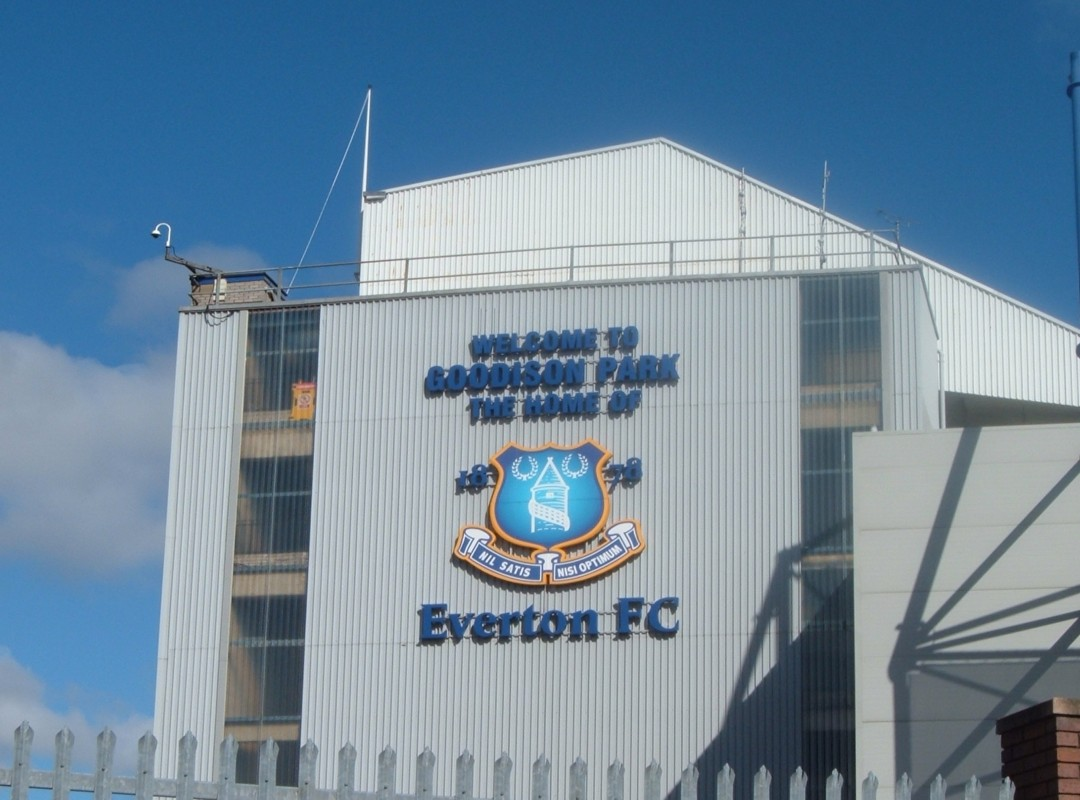
Goodison Park

The 2006–07 Everton F.C. season was Everton's 15th season in the FA Premier League, and their 53rd consecutive season in the top division of English football.

== Season summary ==
Everton finished in sixth place in the Premier League table – enough for participation in the 2007–08 UEFA Cup.

== Final league table ==
| Pos | Team | Pld | W | D | L | GF | GA | GD | Pts | Qualification or relegation |
|---|---|---|---|---|---|---|---|---|---|---|
| 4 | Arsenal | 38 | 19 | 11 | 8 | 63 | 35 | +28 | 68 | Qualification for the Champions League third qualifying round |
| 5 | Tottenham Hotspur | 38 | 17 | 9 | 12 | 57 | 54 | +3 | 60 | Qualification for the UEFA Cup first round (Note: Since both finalists of the FA Cup (Manchester United and Chelsea) and the League Cup winners (Chelsea) were qualified for the Champions League, their UEFA Cup spots were given to the 6th- and 7th-placed Premier League teams.) |
| 6 | Everton | 38 | 15 | 13 | 10 | 52 | 36 | +16 | 58 | Qualification for the UEFA Cup first round |
| 7 | Bolton Wanderers | 38 | 16 | 8 | 14 | 47 | 52 | −5 | 56 | Qualification for the UEFA Cup first round |
| 8 | Reading | 38 | 16 | 7 | 15 | 52 | 47 | +5 | 55 | |

Source: Barclays Premier League
Rules for classification: 1) points; 2) goal difference; 3) number of goals scored.

== First-team squad ==
Squad at end of season

Note: Flags indicate national team as defined under FIFA eligibility rules; some limited exceptions apply. Players may hold more than one non-FIFA nationality.

| No. | Pos. | Nation | Player |
|---|---|---|---|
| 1 | GK | ENG | Richard Wright |
| 2 | DF | ENG | Tony Hibbert |
| 3 | DF | SCO | Gary Naysmith |
| 4 | DF | NGA | Joseph Yobo |
| 6 | MF | ESP | Mikel Arteta |
| 7 | MF | NED | Andy van der Meyde |
| 8 | FW | ENG | Andrew Johnson |
| 9 | FW | ENG | James Beattie |
| 11 | FW | SCO | James McFadden |
| 13 | GK | SCO | Iain Turner |
| 15 | DF | ENG | Alan Stubbs |
| 16 | DF | ENG | Joleon Lescott |
| 17 | MF | AUS | Tim Cahill |

| No. | Pos. | Nation | Player |
|---|---|---|---|
| 18 | MF | ENG | Phil Neville (vice-captain) |
| 19 | DF | POR | Nuno Valente |
| 21 | MF | ENG | Leon Osman |
| 22 | FW | ENG | James Vaughan |
| 23 | DF | ITA | Alessandro Pistone |
| 24 | GK | USA | Tim Howard |
| 26 | MF | IRL | Lee Carsley |
| 28 | FW | NGA | Victor Anichebe |
| 30 | GK | ENG | John Ruddy |
| 36 | DF | SCO | Patrick Boyle |
| 37 | MF | POR | Manuel Fernandes (on loan from Benfica) |
| 38 | MF | BRA | Anderson de Silva |
| 41 | MF | ISL | Bjarni Viðarsson |

=== Left club during season ===
Note: Flags indicate national team as defined under FIFA eligibility rules; some limited exceptions apply. Players may hold more than one non-FIFA nationality.

| No. | Pos. | Nation | Player |
|---|---|---|---|
| 5 | DF | SCO | David Weir (to Rangers) |
| 10 | MF | WAL | Simon Davies (to Fulham) |

| No. | Pos. | Nation | Player |
|---|---|---|---|
| 14 | MF | IRL | Kevin Kilbane (to Wigan Athletic) |
| 31 | DF | ENG | Mark Hughes (to Northampton Town) |

=== Player awards ===
- Player of the Season - Mikel Arteta
- Players' Player of the Season - Joleon Lescott
- Young Player of the Season - James Vaughan
- Reserve / U21 Player of the Season - John Irving
- Academy Player of the Season - Shaun Densmore
- Goal of the Season- James McFadden vs. Charlton Athletic

== Statistics ==
=== Appearances ===
| No. | Pos. | Name | Premier League | | FA Cup | | League Cup | | Total | | Discipline | |
| No. | Pos. | Name | Apps | Goals | Apps | Goals | Apps | Goals | Apps | Goals | Yellow card | Red card |
|---|---|---|---|---|---|---|---|---|---|---|---|---|
| 1 | GK | (England) Richard Wright | 1 | 0 | 0 | 0 | 1 | 0 | 2 | 0 | 0 | 0 |
| 2 | DF | (England) Tony Hibbert | 12(1) | 0 | 0 | 0 | 0 | 0 | 13 | 0 | 0 | 1 |
| 3 | DF | (Scotland) Gary Naysmith | 10(5) | 1 | 0(1) | 0 | 1 | 0 | 17 | 1 | 0 | 0 |
| 4 | DF | (Nigeria) Joseph Yobo | 38 | 2 | 1 | 0 | 1 | 0 | 40 | 2 | 3 | 0 |
| 6 | MF | (Spain) Mikel Arteta | 35 | 9 | 1 | 0 | 2(1) | 0 | 39 | 9 | 9 | 0 |
| 7 | MF | (Netherlands) Andy van der Meyde | 5(3) | 0 | 1 | 0 | 1 | 0 | 10 | 0 | 1 | 0 |
| 8 | FW | (England) Andrew Johnson | 32 | 11 | 1 | 1 | 2 | 0 | 35 | 12 | 4 | 0 |
| 9 | FW | (England) James Beattie | 15(18) | 2 | 0 | 0 | 1(1) | 0 | 35 | 2 | 4 | 0 |
| 11 | FW | (Scotland) James McFadden | 6(13) | 2 | 0 | 0 | 2 | 1 | 21 | 3 | 1 | 1 |
| 13 | GK | (Scotland) Iain Turner | 1 | 0 | 0 | 0 | 1 | 0 | 2 | 0 | 0 | 0 |
| 15 | DF | (England) Alan Stubbs | 23 | 2 | 0 | 0 | 1 | 0 | 24 | 2 | 3 | 0 |
| 16 | DF | (England) Joleon Lescott | 36(2) | 2 | 1 | 0 | 3 | 0 | 42 | 2 | 3 | 0 |
| 17 | MF | (Australia) Tim Cahill | 17(1) | 5 | 0 | 0 | 2(1) | 2 | 21 | 7 | 5 | 0 |
| 18 | DF | (England) Phil Neville | 35 | 1 | 1 | 0 | 2 | 0 | 38 | 1 | 7 | 0 |
| 19 | DF | (Portugal) Nuno Valente | 10(4) | 0 | 1 | 0 | 2 | 0 | 17 | 0 | 2 | 0 |
| 21 | MF | (England) Leon Osman | 31(3) | 3 | 1 | 0 | 2 | 0 | 37 | 3 | 5 | 0 |
| 22 | FW | (England) James Vaughan | 7(7) | 4 | 0(1) | 0 | 0 | 0 | 15 | 4 | 5 | 0 |
| 23 | DF | (Italy) Alessandro Pistone | 0 | 0 | 0 | 0 | 0 | 0 | 0 | 0 | 0 | 0 |
| 24 | GK | (United States) Tim Howard | 36 | 0 | 1 | 0 | 1 | 0 | 38 | 0 | 1 | 0 |
| 26 | MF | (Republic of Ireland) Lee Carsley | 38 | 1 | 1 | 0 | 3 | 0 | 42 | 1 | 4 | 0 |
| 28 | FW | (Nigeria) Victor Anichebe | 5(14) | 3 | 1 | 0 | 1(2) | 1 | 23 | 4 | 6 | 0 |
| 30 | GK | (England) John Ruddy | 0 | 0 | 0 | 0 | 0 | 0 | 0 | 0 | 0 | 0 |
| 36 | DF | (Scotland) Patrick Boyle | 0 | 0 | 0 | 0 | 0 | 0 | 0 | 0 | 0 | 0 |
| 37 | MF | (Portugal) Manuel Fernandes | 8(1) | 2 | 0 | 0 | 0 | 0 | 9 | 2 | 4 | 0 |
| 38 | MF | (Brazil) Anderson Silva | 0(1) | 0 | 0 | 0 | 0 | 0 | 1 | 0 | 0 | 0 |
| 41 | MF | (Iceland) Bjarni Viðarsson | 0 | 0 | 0 | 0 | 0 | 0 | 0 | 0 | 0 | 0 |
Players who made appearances but left the club during the season:
| 5 | DF | (Scotland) David Weir | 2(3) | 0 | 0 | 0 | 1 | 0 | 6 | 0 | 0 | 0 |
| 10 | MF | (Wales) Simon Davies | 13(2) | 0 | 0 | 0 | 2 | 0 | 17 | 0 | 1 | 0 |
| 14 | MF | (Republic of Ireland) Kevin Kilbane | 2 | 0 | 0 | 0 | 0 | 0 | 2 | 0 | 0 | 1 |
| 31 | DF | (England) Mark Hughes | 0(1) | 0 | 0 | 0 | 1(1) | 0 | 3 | 0 | 0 | 0 |

== Results ==
=== Premier League ===
==== Results by round ====
| Round | 1 | 2 | 3 | 4 | 5 | 6 | 7 | 8 | 9 | 10 | 11 | 12 | 13 | 14 | 15 | 16 | 17 | 18 | 19 | 20 | 21 | 22 | 23 | 24 | 25 | 26 | 27 | 28 | 29 | 30 | 31 | 32 | 33 | 34 | 35 | 36 | 37 | 38 |
|---|---|---|---|---|---|---|---|---|---|---|---|---|---|---|---|---|---|---|---|---|---|---|---|---|---|---|---|---|---|---|---|---|---|---|---|---|---|---|
| Ground | H | A | A | H | H | A | H | A | H | A | A | H | H | A | A | H | A | H | A | H | H | A | H | A | A | H | H | A | A | H | A | H | A | H | A | H | H | A |
| Result | W | D | W | W | D | D | D | L | W | D | L | L | W | D | L | W | L | L | W | D | W | L | D | W | D | W | L | W | D | W | D | W | D | W | L | L | W | D |
| Position | 7 | 7 | 4 | 3 | 4 | 4 | 6 | 7 | 6 | 6 | 7 | 7 | 7 | 8 | 10 | 7 | 10 | 10 | 8 | 8 | 7 | 8 | 7 | 7 | 9 | 8 | 8 | 7 | 6 | 6 | 7 | 6 | 6 | 5 | 5 | 6 | 5 | 6 |

Updated to match(es) played on 13 May 2007 (end of season). Source: worldfootball.net
A = Away; H = Home; W = Win; D = Draw; L = Loss

==== Matches ====
| 19 August 2006 1 | Everton | 2–1 | Watford | Liverpool |
| 15:00 | Johnson 15'; Arteta 82' (pen.) | Report | Stubbs 90' (o.g.) | Stadium: Goodison Park; Attendance: 39,691; Referee: Peter Walton |

| 23 August 2006 2 | Blackburn Rovers | 1–1 | Everton | Blackburn |
| 20:00 | McCarthy 50' | Report | Cahill 84' | Stadium: Ewood Park; Attendance: 22,018; Referee: Uriah Rennie |

| 26 August 2006 3 | Tottenham Hotspur | 0–2 | Everton | Tottenham, London |
| 15:00 | | Report | Kilbane (yellow card) 33' (yellow-red card); Davenport 53' (o.g.); Johnson 66' | Stadium: White Hart Lane; Attendance: 35,540; Referee: Mark Halsey |

| 9 September 2006 4 | Everton | 3–0 | Liverpool | Liverpool |
| 12:45 | Cahill 24'; Yobo (yellow card) 34'; A. Johnson 36', 90+4' | Report | Sissoko (yellow card) 75'; Riise (yellow card) 79'; Hyypiä (yellow card) 90+2' | Stadium: Goodison Park; Attendance: 40,004; Referee: Graham Poll |

| 16 September 2006 5 | Everton | 2–2 | Wigan Athletic | Liverpool |
| 15:00 | Johnson 49'; Beattie 66' (pen.) | Report | Scharner 62', 68' | Stadium: Goodison Park; Attendance: 37,117; Referee: Alan Wiley |

| 24 September 2006 6 | Newcastle United | 1–1 | Everton | Newcastle upon Tyne |
| 16:00 | Ameobi 14'; Bramble (yellow card) 75' (yellow-red card) | Report | Cahill 41'; Hibbert (yellow card) 77' (yellow-red card) | Stadium: St James' Park; Attendance: 50,107; Referee: Steve Bennett |

| 30 September 2006 7 | Everton | 1–1 | Manchester City | Liverpool |
| 15:00 | Johnson 44' | Report | Richards 90+4' | Stadium: Goodison Park; Attendance: 38,250; Referee: Andre Marriner |

| 14 October 2006 8 | Middlesbrough | 2–1 | Everton | Middlesbrough |
| 15:00 | Yakubu 27' (pen.); Viduka 71' | Report | Cahill 77' | Stadium: Riverside Stadium; Attendance: 27,156; Referee: Mark Halsey |

| 21 October 2006 9 | Everton | 2–0 | Sheffield United | Liverpool |
| 15:00 | Arteta 13'; Beattie 33' (pen.) | Report | Davis (red card) 32' | Stadium: Goodison Park; Attendance: 37,900; Referee: Dermot Gallagher |

| 28 October 2006 10 | Arsenal | 1–1 | Everton | Highbury, London |
| 15:00 | Van Persie 71' | Report | Cahill 11' | Stadium: Emirates Stadium; Attendance: 60,047; Referee: Mike Riley |

| 4 November 2006 11 | Fulham | 1–0 | Everton | Fulham, London |
| 12:45 | C. Jensen 66' | Report | | Stadium: Craven Cottage; Attendance: 23,327; Referee: Martin Atkinson |

| 11 November 2006 12 | Everton | 0–1 | Aston Villa | Liverpool |
| 15:00 | | Report | Sutton 42' | Stadium: Goodison Park; Attendance: 36,376; Referee: Phil Dowd |

| 18 November 2006 13 | Everton | 1–0 | Bolton Wanderers | Liverpool |
| 15:00 | Arteta 60' | Report | | Stadium: Goodison Park; Attendance: 34,417; Referee: Uriah Rennie |

| 25 November 2006 14 | Charlton Athletic | 1–1 | Everton | Charlton, London |
| 12:45 | Reid 68' | Report | Hreiðarsson 52' (o.g.) | Stadium: The Valley; Attendance: 26,435; Referee: Alan Wiley |

| 29 November 2006 15 | Manchester United | 3–0 | Everton | Trafford |
| 20:00 | Ronaldo 39'; Evra 63'; O'Shea 89' | Report | | Stadium: Old Trafford; Attendance: 75,723; Referee: Mark Halsey |

| 3 December 2006 16 | Everton | 2–0 | West Ham United | Liverpool |
| 16:00 | Osman 51'; Vaughan 90+3' | Report | | Stadium: Goodison Park; Attendance: 32,968; Referee: Martin Atkinson |

| 9 December 2006 17 | Portsmouth | 2–0 | Everton | Portsmouth |
| 15:00 | Taylor 14'; Kanu 26' | Report | | Stadium: Fratton Park; Attendance: 19,528; Referee: Mark Clattenburg |

| 17 December 2006 18 | Everton | 2–3 | Chelsea | Liverpool |
| 13:45 | Arteta 38' (pen.); Yobo 64' | Report | Howard 49' (o.g.); Lampard 81'; Drogba 87' | Stadium: Goodison Park; Attendance: 33,970; Referee: Mark Halsey |

| 23 December 2006 19 | Reading | 0–2 | Everton | Reading |
| 15:00 | | Report | Johnson 14'; McFadden 47' | Stadium: Madejski Stadium; Attendance: 24,053; Referee: Steve Tanner |

| 26 December 2006 20 | Everton | 0–0 | Middlesbrough | Liverpool |
| 15:00 | | Report | | Stadium: Goodison Park; Attendance: 38,126; Referee: Phil Dowd |

| 30 December 2006 21 | Everton | 3–0 | Newcastle United | Liverpool |
| 15:00 | Anichebe 9', 58'; Neville 62' | Report | | Stadium: Goodison Park; Attendance: 38,682; Referee: Dermot Gallagher |

| 1 January 2007 22 | Manchester City | 2–1 | Everton | Manchester |
| 15:00 | Samaras 50', 72' (pen.) | Report | Osman 84' | Stadium: City of Manchester Stadium; Attendance: 39,836; Referee: Uriah Rennie |

| 14 January 2007 23 | Everton | 1–1 | Reading | Liverpool |
| 13:45 | Johnson 81' | Report | Lescott 28' (o.g.) | Stadium: Goodison Park; Attendance: 34,722; Referee: Mike Riley |

| 21 January 2007 24 | Wigan Athletic | 0–2 | Everton | Wigan |
| 13:30 | | Report | Arteta 65' (pen.), 90+2' | Stadium: JJB Stadium; Attendance: 18,149; Referee: Howard Webb |

| 3 February 2007 25 | Liverpool | 0–0 | Everton | Liverpool |
| 12:45 | | Report | | Stadium: Anfield; Attendance: 44,234; Referee: Alan Wiley |

| 10 February 2007 26 | Everton | 1–0 | Blackburn Rovers | Liverpool |
| 15:00 | Johnson 10' | Report | | Stadium: Goodison Park; Attendance: 35,593; Referee: Rob Styles |

| 21 February 2007 27 | Everton | 1–2 | Tottenham Hotspur | Liverpool |
| 20:00 | Arteta 42' | Report | Berbatov 35'; Jenas 89' | Stadium: Goodison Park; Attendance: 34,121; Referee: Uriah Rennie |

| 24 February 2007 28 | Watford | 0–3 | Everton | Watford |
| 17:15 | | Report | Fernandes 23'; Johnson 25' (pen.); Osman 90+2' | Stadium: Vicarage Road; Attendance: 18,761; Referee: Lee Mason |

| 3 March 2007 29 | Sheffield United | 1–1 | Everton | Sheffield |
| 15:00 | Hulse 52' | Report | Arteta 75' (pen.) | Stadium: Bramall Lane; Attendance: 32,019; Referee: Mike Riley |

| 18 March 2007 30 | Everton | 1–0 | Arsenal | Liverpool |
| 16:00 | Johnson 90+1' | Report | | Stadium: Goodison Park; Attendance: 37,162; Referee: Mark Clattenburg |

| 2 April 2007 31 | Aston Villa | 1–1 | Everton | Birmingham |
| 20:00 | Agbonlahor 83' | Report | Lescott 15' | Stadium: Villa Park; Attendance: 36,407; Referee: Howard Webb |

| 6 April 2007 32 | Everton | 4–1 | Fulham | Liverpool |
| 19:30 | Carsley 25'; Stubbs 34'; Vaughan 45'; Anichebe 80' | Report | Bocanegra 22' | Stadium: Goodison Park; Attendance: 35,612; Referee: Dermot Gallagher |

| 9 April 2007 33 | Bolton Wanderers | 1–1 | Everton | Bolton |
| 15:00 | Davies 18' | Report | Vaughan 33' | Stadium: Reebok Stadium; Attendance: 25,179; Referee: Martin Atkinson |

| 15 April 2007 34 | Everton | 2–1 | Charlton Athletic | Liverpool |
| 15:00 | Lescott 81'; McFadden 90+2' | Report | D. Bent 89' | Stadium: Goodison Park; Attendance: 34,028; Referee: Mark Halsey |

| 21 April 2007 35 | West Ham United | 1–0 | Everton | Upton Park, London |
| 15:00 | Zamora 13' | Report | | Stadium: Boleyn Ground; Attendance: 34,945; Referee: Mark Clattenburg |

| 28 April 2007 36 | Everton | 2–4 | Manchester United | Liverpool |
| 12:45 | Stubbs 12'; Fernandes 50' | Report | O'Shea 61'; Neville 68' (o.g.); Rooney 79'; Eagles 90+3' | Stadium: Goodison Park; Attendance: 39,682; Referee: Alan Wiley |

| 5 May 2007 37 | Everton | 3–0 | Portsmouth | Liverpool |
| 15:00 | Arteta 59' (pen.); Yobo 62'; Naysmith 90+4' | Report | | Stadium: Goodison Park; Attendance: 39,619; Referee: Howard Webb |

| 13 May 2007 38 | Chelsea | 1–1 | Everton | Fulham, London |
| 15:00 | Drogba 57' | Report | Vaughan 50' | Stadium: Stamford Bridge; Attendance: 41,746; Referee: Mark Halsey |

=== League Cup ===
| 19 September Second round | Peterborough United | 1 – 2 | Everton | Peterborough |
| 19:45 | Benjamin 56' | Report | Stirling 24' (o.g.); Cahill 87' | Stadium: London Road Stadium; Attendance: 10,756; Referee: Iain Williamson |

| 24 October Third round | Everton | 4 – 0 | Luton Town | Liverpool |
| 20:00 | Cahill 23'; Keane 34' (o.g.); McFadden 53'; Anichebe 83' | Report | | Stadium: Goodison Park; Attendance: 27,149; Referee: Steve Tanner |

| 8 November Fourth round | Everton | 0 – 1 | Arsenal | Liverpool |
| 20:00 | McFadden (red card) 19' | Report | Adebayor 85' | Stadium: Goodison Park; Attendance: 31,045; Referee: Graham Poll |

=== FA Cup ===
| 7 January Third round proper | Everton | 1 – 4 | Blackburn Rovers | Liverpool |
| 15:00 | Johnson 69' (pen.) | Report | Derbyshire 5'; Pedersen 21'; Gallagher 38'; McCarthy 90+2' | Stadium: Goodison Park; Attendance: 24,426; Referee: Andre Marriner |

== Transfers ==
=== In ===
| Date | Pos. | Name | From | Fee |
|---|---|---|---|---|
| 30 May 2006 | FW | (England) Andrew Johnson | (England) Crystal Palace | £8.6m |
| 14 June 2006 | DF | (England) Joleon Lescott | (England) Wolverhampton Wanderers | £5m |
| 1 July 2007 | GK | (United States) Tim Howard | (England) Manchester United | Undisclosed |

=== Out ===
| Date | Pos. | Name | To | Fee |
|---|---|---|---|---|
| 8 May 2006 | FW | (Scotland) Duncan Ferguson | Released | |
| 8 May 2006 | MF | (England) Jay Harris | Released | |
| 8 May 2006 | FW | (England) Paul Hopkins | Released | |
| 8 May 2006 | MF | (China) Li Tie | Released | |
| 8 May 2006 | MF | (England) Laurence Wilson | Released | |
| 8 June 2006 | GK | (England) Nigel Martyn | Retired | |
| 31 August 2006 | MF | (Republic of Ireland) Kevin Kilbane | (England) Wigan Athletic | Undisclosed |
| 16 January 2007 | DF | (Scotland) David Weir | (Scotland) Rangers | Free |
| 24 January 2007 | MF | (Wales) Simon Davies | (England) Fulham | Undisclosed |
| 31 January 2007 | DF | (England) Mark Hughes | (England) Northampton Town | Undisclosed |

=== Loan in ===
| Date from | Date to | Pos. | Name | From | Ref. |
|---|---|---|---|---|---|
| 1 July 2006 | 30 June 2007 | GK | (United States) Tim Howard | (England) Manchester United | |
| 31 January 2007 | 30 June 2007 | MF | (Portugal) Manuel Fernandes | (Portugal) Benfica | |

=== Loan out ===
| Date from | Date to | Pos. | Name | To | Ref. |
|---|---|---|---|---|---|
| 12 September 2006 | 27 November 2006 | GK | (England) John Ruddy | (England) Stockport County | |
| 14 September 2006 | 17 October 2006 | DF | (Scotland) Patrick Boyle | (England) Norwich City | |
| 16 November 2006 | 16 December 2006 | GK | (Scotland) Iain Turner | (England) Crystal Palace | |
| 8 February 2007 | 7 March 2007 | MF | (Iceland) Bjarni Viðarsson | (England) Bournemouth | |
| 9 February 2007 | 13 March 2007 | GK | (England) John Ruddy | (Wales) Wrexham | |
| 23 February 2007 | 23 April 2007 | GK | (Scotland) Iain Turner | (England) Sheffield Wednesday | |
| 21 April 2007 | 28 April 2007 | GK | (England) John Ruddy | (England) Bristol City | |
