= James Vaughan (footballer, born 1988) =

English footballer (born 1988)

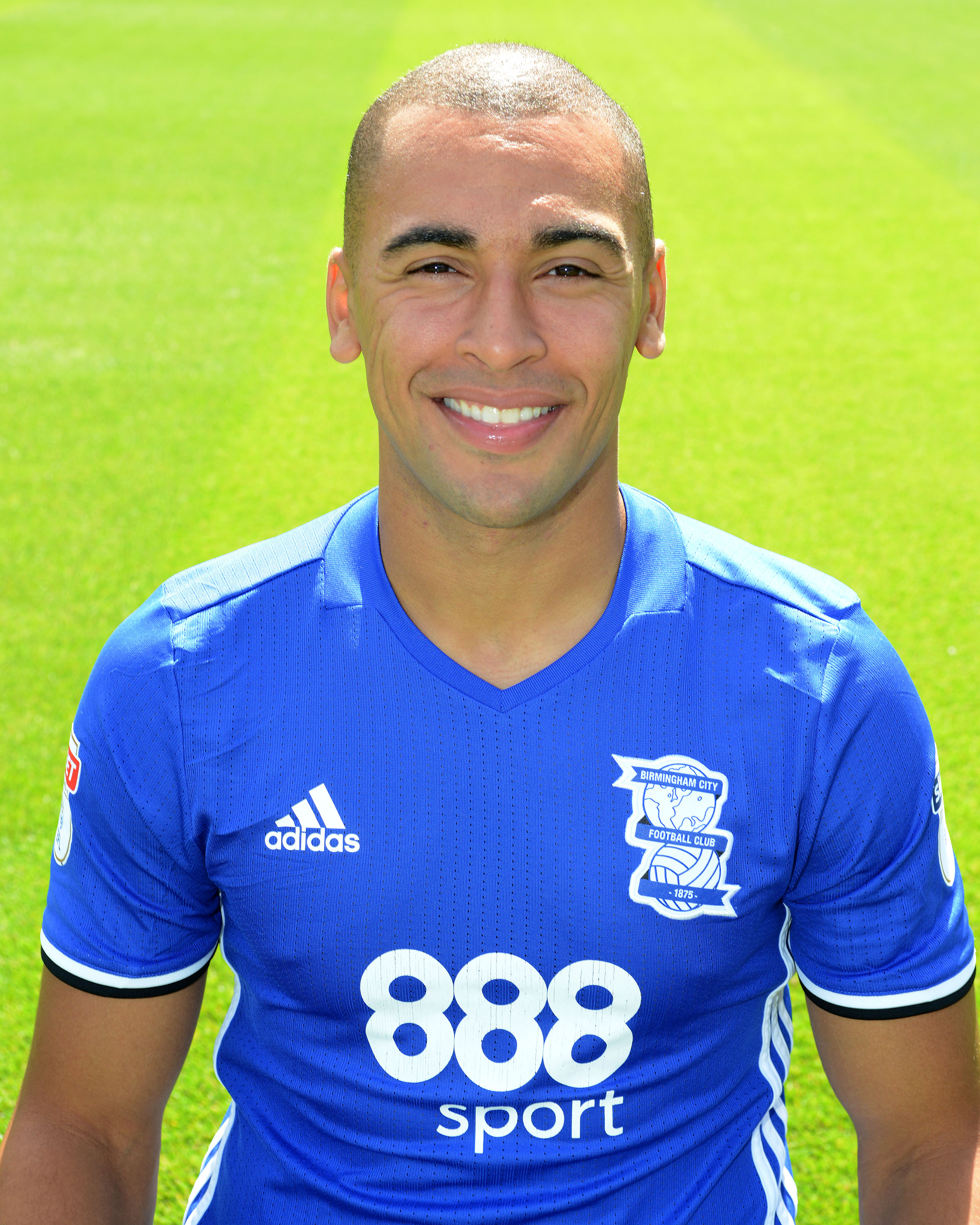
- Vaughan with Birmingham City in 2016

Personal information
- Full name: James Oliver Vaughan
- Date of birth: 14 July 1988 (age 38)
- Place of birth: Birmingham, England
- Height: 5 ft 11 in (1.81 m)
- Position: Forward

Youth career
- 2002–2004: Everton

Senior career*
Years	Team	Apps	(Gls)
2004–2011	Everton	47	(7)
2009	→ Derby County (loan)	2	(0)
2010	→ Leicester City (loan)	8	(1)
2010	→ Crystal Palace (loan)	14	(5)
2011	→ Crystal Palace (loan)	16	(4)
2011–2013	Norwich City	5	(0)
2012–2013	→ Huddersfield Town (loan)	33	(14)
2013–2016	Huddersfield Town	53	(17)
2015–2016	→ Birmingham City (loan)	15	(0)
2016	Birmingham City	0	(0)
2016–2017	Bury	37	(24)
2017–2018	Sunderland	23	(2)
2018–2019	Wigan Athletic	38	(5)
2019	→ Portsmouth (loan)	10	(0)
2019–2020	Bradford City	25	(11)
2020	→ Tranmere Rovers (loan)	8	(3)
2020–2021	Tranmere Rovers	29	(18)
Total		363	(111)

International career
2005	England U17	6	(2)
2006–2007	England U19	3	(3)
2007–2011	England U21	4	(0)
- * Club domestic league appearances and goals

James Oliver Vaughan (born 14 July 1988) is an English former professional footballer who played as a forward. He is currently the loans pathway manager at Everton.

Vaughan, who was born in Birmingham, signed his first professional contract with Everton. He played for the club between 2005 and 2011, including loan spells at Derby County, Leicester City and Crystal Palace, before signing for Norwich in May 2011. He then had a loan spell at Huddersfield Town for the majority of the 2012–13 season, before signing permanent terms on 3 July 2013. He spent two and a half seasons with Huddersfield before joining Birmingham City on loan. The move was made permanent at the end of the 2015–16 season, but his stay was brief, as he joined Bury in August 2016. Vaughan played for just a single season at Bury, making 40 appearances and scoring 24 times. He completed a move to Championship club Sunderland in July 2017, playing 27 times before leaving to join Wigan Athletic in January 2018. He spent time on loan at Portsmouth in 2018–19.

He has represented England at under-17, under-19 and under-21 age groups, but later expressed a desire to represent Jamaica at international level. He became the Premier League's youngest-ever goalscorer in 2005, until the record was broken by Arsenal’s Max Dowman in 2026.

== Early life ==
Born in Birmingham, West Midlands, Vaughan went to Hill West primary school and The Arthur Terry School in Four Oaks. He was spotted by Everton's talent scouts at nine years of age while playing in his primary school's football team and joined the club's academy. He attended Chesterfield High School in Crosby while at the academy. His father, property developer Dorrington Vaughan, played rugby union for Preston Grasshoppers.

Vaughan was also a talented young sprinter, running the 100 metres in 11.5 seconds as a 13-year-old, the third-fastest time for his age in Britain.

== Club career ==
=== Everton ===
Vaughan joined Everton's Youth Academy and was voted by his teammates as the Under-16s player of the season for 2003–04. He scored a number of goals for the reserve team during the 2004–05 season, making his full debut for the club in the same season. His 73rd-minute substitute appearance for the first team against Crystal Palace on his debut on 10 April 2005, which included a goal, meant that he overtook James Milner as the Premier League's youngest scorer at 16 years and 271 days as well as Wayne Rooney as Everton's youngest top flight goal scorer.

Vaughan signed his first professional contract in the summer of 2005, agreeing to a two-year contract. Early in the 2005–06 campaign, he sustained a knee ligament injury whilst on international duty with England Under-18s. A series of complications sidelined him for the remainder of the campaign and he did not have the chance to establish himself as a regular in the senior squad. He scored his second league goal in the 93rd minute of a 2–0 win over West Ham United. Vaughan suffered a severed foot artery in a match with Bolton.

Vaughan played a total of 60 times for Everton, making only 8 league starts, and scored 9 goals. His career at the club was blighted by a number of injuries which limited his opportunities to establish himself in the first team.

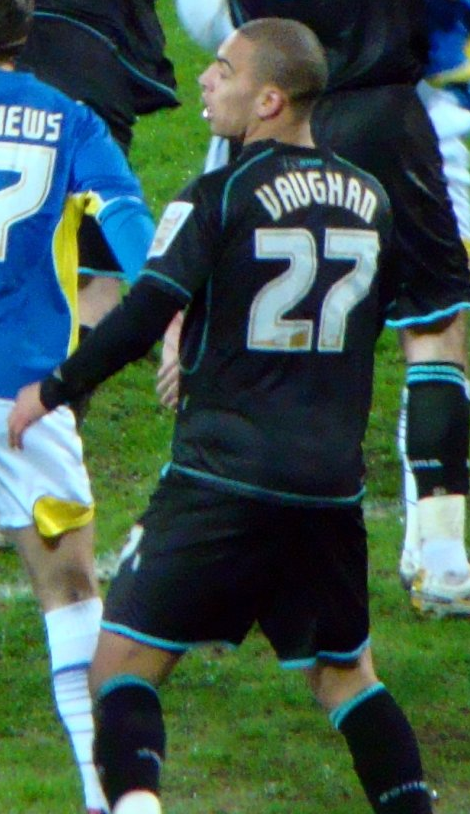
Vaughan playing for Leicester City in March 2010

==== Loan to Derby County ====
In September 2009, Vaughan joined Football League Championship club Derby County on a three-month loan.

==== Loan to Leicester City ====
On 11 March 2010, Vaughan joined Leicester City on an initial one-month loan deal; an option to extend it until the end of the season was later taken up. He scored his first goal for Leicester after coming on as a substitute against Watford.

==== Loan to Crystal Palace ====
On 8 September 2010, Vaughan joined Crystal Palace, the club against which he had become the Premier League's youngest goal-scorer, on a three-month loan deal. At the end of the loan spell he returned to Everton but, in January 2011, rejoined Palace until the end of the season. Vaughan made 30 appearances for Palace, scoring 9 times.

=== Norwich City ===
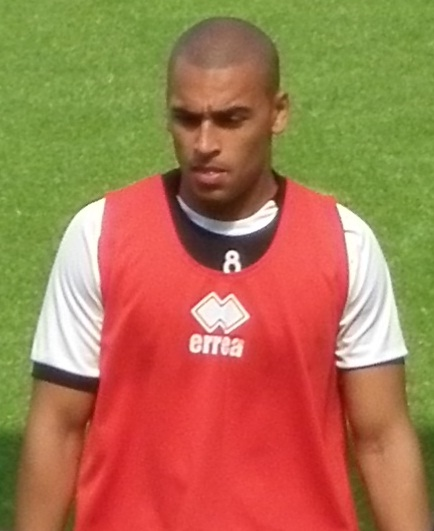
Vaughan during a Norwich City training session in August 2012

On 27 May 2011, Vaughan signed for newly promoted Premier League club Norwich City on a three-year contract for an undisclosed fee. Vaughan made his debut for the club against West Bromwich Albion on 11 September, and made just five league appearances in an injury-hit first season.

==== Loan to Huddersfield Town ====
On 24 August 2012, Vaughan joined newly promoted Football League Championship team Huddersfield Town on a season-long loan arrangement. Vaughan made his debut for the Terriers in a 2–0 home victory over Burnley on 26 August, the team's first league win of the season. Vaughan scored his first goal as a Huddersfield Town player with the equalising goal in a 2–2 draw away at Ipswich Town on 1 September, and he later had a penalty saved.

=== Huddersfield Town ===
On 3 July 2013, Vaughan signed a three-year deal with Huddersfield for an undisclosed fee. He made his second debut for the club in the 1–0 defeat by Nottingham Forest on 3 August. After scoring two goals in the League Cup win over Bradford City on 6 August, he scored his first league goal on his return in the 1–1 draw with Queens Park Rangers on 10 August. On 24 August, he scored a hat-trick in a 5–1 win against AFC Bournemouth.

=== Birmingham City ===
Vaughan joined fellow Championship club Birmingham City on 26 November 2015, on loan until 2 January 2016. He made his debut as a second-half substitute in the next game, a 2–1 defeat at Brighton & Hove Albion, and made six appearances in total without scoring. The loan was then extended until the end of the season, when his contract with Huddersfield expired, at which point it would be converted to a one-year permanent contract with an option for a further season. He missed a penalty in Birmingham's FA Cup loss to Premier League club Bournemouth that would have given his team a lead, and finished the season with no goals from 16 appearances, most of which were as a substitute. During the close season, he was strongly linked with a move to Rangers, but no such move took place. He had been frustrated by his lack of first-team involvement in the second half of 2015–16 season, and when this continued into the new season – his only appearance was a start in the League Cup defeat to Oxford United – he chose to leave.

=== Bury ===
On 24 August 2016, Vaughan left Birmingham by mutual consent. He signed a two-year contract with Bury of League One. He made a scoring debut three days later away to Walsall, with Bury's second goal as they came back from 3–0 down to secure a draw. During the 2016–17 season Vaughan scored 24 goals, which earned him a place in the League One Team of the Year and made a major contribution to Bury narrowly avoiding relegation on the final day of the season.

=== Sunderland ===
On 13 July 2017, Vaughan joined Championship club Sunderland for an undisclosed fee reported to be around £500,000, reuniting him with former Huddersfield manager Simon Grayson. He scored his first goal for Sunderland in a 1–1 draw at Hull City on 16 September 2017.

=== Wigan Athletic ===
On 12 January 2018, Vaughan signed for Wigan Athletic on an 18-month contract for an undisclosed fee, returning to League One after only scoring twice in 27 appearances for Sunderland.

Vaughan joined League One club Portsmouth on 31 January 2019 on loan until the end of the season. He made ten league appearances without scoring, played in the second leg of Portsmouth's play-off semi-final defeat to Sunderland, and was an unused substitute as Portsmouth beat the same opponents to win the 2018–19 EFL Trophy.

=== Bradford City ===
On 25 June 2019 it was announced that Vaughan would join League Two club Bradford City on 1 July, following his release by Wigan, on a three-year contract. Ahead of the new season he was named as Bradford City's new club captain.

=== Tranmere Rovers ===
Vaughan joined League One club Tranmere Rovers on 29 January 2020 on loan for the remainder of the season.

The deal was made permanent in August 2020, after parent club Bradford City agreed a mutual decision to terminate the remainder of Vaughan's contract.

On 27 May 2021, Vaughan announced his retirement from professional football.

== International career ==
=== Youth ===
Vaughan was called up to the England under-19 squad, scoring the winning goal after coming on as a second-half substitute against Switzerland. At the end of the 2006–07 season, Vaughan was named in Stuart Pearce's 23-man squad for England U21s' European Championship campaign. His first appearance for the team came as a substitute in the 2–2 draw with Italy U21s on 14 June 2007. Vaughan went on to make four appearances for the U21s between 2007 and 2011 with his record standing at one win, two draws and a loss. His final appearance for the U21s came in February 2011, also against Italy.

In October 2012, Vaughan tweeted that he wanted to represent Jamaica at international level.

== Career statistics ==
As of match played 23 May 2021

Appearances and goals by club, season and competition
Club	Season	League			FA Cup		League Cup		Other		Total	
Club	Season	Division	Apps	Goals	Apps	Goals	Apps	Goals	Apps	Goals	Apps	Goals
Everton	2004–05	Premier League	2	1	0	0	0	0	—		2	1
Everton	2005–06	Premier League	1	0	0	0	0	0	0	0	1	0
Everton	2006–07	Premier League	14	4	1	0	0	0	—		15	4
Everton	2007–08	Premier League	8	1	1	0	2	0	2 (Note: Appearance(s) in UEFA Cup)	1	13	2
Everton	2008–09	Premier League	13	0	2	0	1	0	1	0	17	0
Everton	2009–10	Premier League	8	1	2	1	0	0	1 (Note: Appearance in UEFA Europa League)	0	11	2
Everton	2010–11	Premier League	1	0	0	0	0	0	—		1	0
Everton	Total		47	7	6	1	3	0	4	1	60	9
Derby County (loan)	2009–10	Championship	2	0	—		—		—		2	0
Leicester City (loan)	2009–10	Championship	8	1	—		—		—		8	1
Crystal Palace (loan)	2010–11	Championship	30	9	0	0	—		—		30	9
Norwich City	2011–12	Premier League	5	0	1	0	0	0	—		6	0
Norwich City	2012–13	Premier League	0	0	—		—		—		0	0
Norwich City	Total		5	0	1	0	0	0	—		6	0
Huddersfield Town (loan)	2012–13	Championship	33	14	4	0	0	0	—		37	14
Huddersfield Town	2013–14	Championship	23	10	1	0	2	2	—		26	12
Huddersfield Town	2014–15	Championship	26	7	1	0	1	0	—		28	7
Huddersfield Town	2015–16	Championship	4	0	0	0	0	0	—		4	0
Huddersfield Town	Total		86	31	6	0	3	2	—		95	33
Birmingham City (loan)	2015–16	Championship	15	0	1	0	—		—		16	0
Birmingham City	2016–17	Championship	0	0	—		1	0	—		1	0
Birmingham City	Total		15	0	1	0	1	0	—		17	0
Bury	2016–17	League One	37	24	2	0	—		1 (Note: Appearance in EFL Trophy)	0	40	24
Sunderland	2017–18	Championship	23	2	1	0	3	0	—		27	2
Wigan Athletic	2017–18	League One	19	3	—		—		—		19	3
Wigan Athletic	2018–19	Championship	19	2	0	0	1	1	—		20	3
Wigan Athletic	Total		38	5	0	0	1	1	—		39	6
Portsmouth (loan)	2018–19	League One	10	0	0	0	—		1 (Note: Appearance in EFL League One play-offs)	0	11	0
Bradford City	2019–20	League Two	25	11	2	0	0	0	0	0	27	11
Tranmere Rovers (loan)	2019–20	League One	8	3	—		—		—		8	3
Tranmere Rovers	2020–21	League Two	29	18	3	0	1	1	5	3	38	22
Tranmere Rovers	Total		37	21	3	0	1	1	5	3	46	25
Career total			363	111	22	1	12	4	11	4	408	120

== Honours ==
Everton

- FA Cup runner-up: 2008–09

Wigan Athletic

- EFL League One: 2017–18

Portsmouth

- EFL Trophy: 2018–19

Individual

- Everton Young Player of the Season: 2006–07
- Football League Championship Player of the Month: April 2013, August 2013
- EFL League One Player of the Month: January 2017
- PFA Team of the Year: 2016–17 League One, 2020–21 League Two
