= James Beattie (footballer) =

English footballer and manager (born 1978)

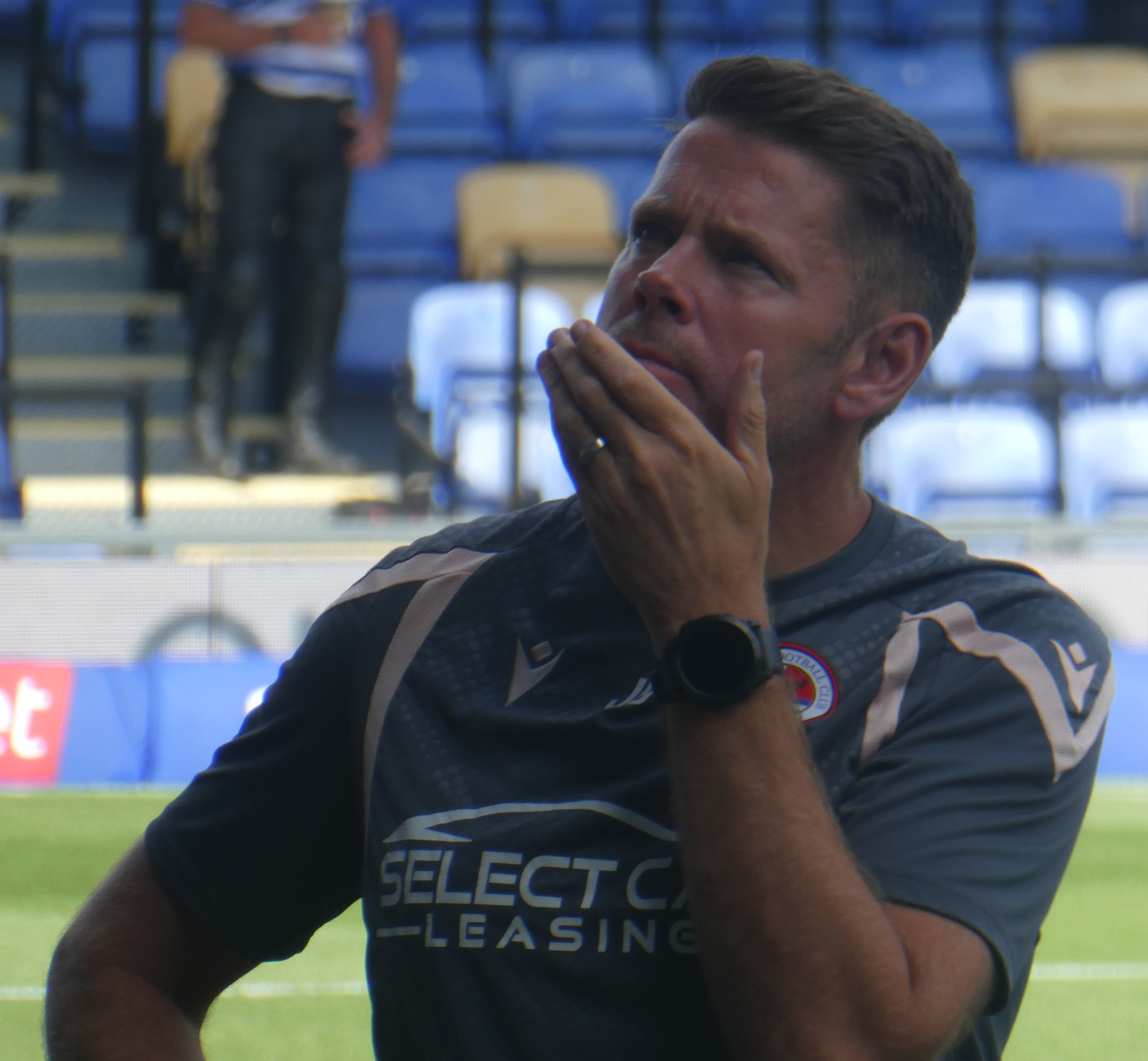
- Beattie with Reading in 2026

Personal information
- Full name: James Scott Beattie
- Date of birth: 27 February 1978 (age 48)
- Place of birth: Lancaster, Lancashire, England
- Height: 6 ft 1 in (1.85 m)
- Position: Striker

Team information
- Current team: Reading (first-team coach)

Youth career
- 1995–1996: Blackburn Rovers

Senior career*
Years	Team	Apps	(Gls)
1996–1998	Blackburn Rovers	4	(0)
1998–2005	Southampton	204	(68)
2005–2007	Everton	76	(13)
2007–2009	Sheffield United	62	(34)
2009–2010	Stoke City	38	(10)
2010–2011	Rangers	7	(0)
2011	→ Blackpool (loan)	9	(0)
2011–2012	Sheffield United	18	(0)
2012–2013	Accrington Stanley	25	(6)
Total		443	(131)

International career
1998–1999	England U21	5	(1)
2003	England	5	(0)

Managerial career
- 2013–2014: Accrington Stanley
- * Club domestic league appearances and goals

James Scott Beattie (born 27 February 1978) is an English football coach and a former professional footballer who played as a striker. He is currently a first-team coach at Reading.

He was previously a part of Garry Monk's backroom staff, working with him at Birmingham City, Middlesbrough, Leeds United, Swansea City and Sheffield Wednesday.

Born in Lancaster, Lancashire, he came through the ranks at Blackburn Rovers, eventually signing professionally for them in 1995. Beattie then went on to have spells at Southampton, Everton, Sheffield United, Stoke City, Rangers, and a short spell on loan at Blackpool, before eventually returning to Sheffield United for a second term. When signed by Everton, and for his first spell at Sheffield United, he commanded the highest fee ever paid for a player by each club at that time.

== Early life ==
Born in Lancaster, Lancashire, Beattie was a gifted pupil and attended the Queen Elizabeth's Grammar School. He was a very good swimmer, rated second in the country at the 100 metres freestyle at 14, but he dropped swimming in favour of football after damaging the cartilage tissue on his shoulder.

He went on to represent his school, and play for Blackburn Schools, before joining Blackburn Rovers as a trainee on 7 March 1995.

== Club career ==
=== Blackburn Rovers ===
He made his first-team debut for Blackburn Rovers in October 1996, in a 2–0 home defeat against Arsenal. He had made only seven first-team appearances, and had yet to score a goal, when, in the 1998 close season, he was transferred to Southampton.

=== Southampton ===
He joined Southampton in July 1998 valued at £1 million, as a make-weight part of the deal that took Kevin Davies to Ewood Park for a £7 million fee. Beattie's initial impact was positive, earning him the club's Player of the Season award as he helped the Saints stave off relegation. His second season was hampered by a series of injuries, but in November 2000 he began a long goalscoring run. After 18 months without a goal, he scored 10 in 10 matches, lifting Southampton into a comfortable position, and securing their place in the Premier League for the next season. His form then deserted him once again, and he scored only two goals during the remainder of the season.

Beattie was awarded a new four-year contract in March 2001. However, he failed to score in the remainder of the 2000–01 season, or in the first five Premier League matches of the next – a run that eventually totalled 17 matches. He returned to scoring form at the end of September 2001, and he ended 2001–02 with an impressive total of 14, despite a two-month spell on the sidelines, the result of an ankle injury which he sustained in a match against Manchester United in January 2002.

In 2002–03, Beattie scored 23 league goals, making him the third-highest Premiership goalscorer (and the highest English goalscorer) for that season. His fine form helped Southampton reach the 2003 FA Cup final, their first since victory in 1976. Southampton lost 1–0 to Arsenal and Beattie had to settle for a runners-up medal.

He eventually left Southampton in January 2005, joining Everton for a £6 million fee.

=== Everton ===
Beattie found it difficult to settle at Everton, and, in only his fifth Premier League appearance for the club, he was sent off for a headbutt on Chelsea defender William Gallas, leading to an automatic three-match suspension, and this, combined with a series of injuries, severely limited his contribution during what remained of 2004–05.

The 2005–06 season saw an improvement: Beattie was Everton's top scorer, with ten goals in the Premier League and one in a 2–1 home defeat against Villarreal in the qualifying stages of the UEFA Champions League. Villarreal also won their own home leg 2–1, meaning Everton progressed no further.

During 2006–07, Beattie found himself peripheral to the plans of Everton boss David Moyes. He made 33 Premier League appearances, but 18 of them were from the substitutes' bench, and managed only two goals, the second of those coming in October, after which he failed to find the net again. Out of favour, it was reported that Blackburn Rovers were interested in signing him for a second spell, followed by news that Sheffield United were interested in securing his services.

=== Sheffield United ===
At the start of August 2007, Beattie signed for Sheffield United for a £4 million fee, this being the biggest transfer fee ever paid by Sheffield United. In the first match of the new season, he scored on his Championship debut for United against Colchester United, and then continued in fine form, scoring regularly, and was named Championship Player of the Month for August/September.

Beattie scored a total of 22 goals in the Championship in 2007–08. This made him the joint second-highest scorer in the division, alongside former Southampton teammate Kevin Phillips of West Bromwich Albion, and one behind Sylvan Ebanks-Blake (who scored 11 for Plymouth Argyle and 12 for Wolverhampton Wanderers). He was named as the Blades' Player of the Year at the end of the season.

In 2008–09, Beattie continued his goal-scoring form, scoring 12 goals before the turn of the year.

=== Stoke City ===
With Sheffield United trying to reduce costs, Beattie returned to the Premier League in January 2009, after signing for Stoke City on a two-and-a-half-year contract for a fee that could eventually rise to £3.5 million. He made an immediate impact, scoring his first goal for Stoke in a 3–1 defeat at Tottenham Hotspur on 27 January 2009. He went on to score seven goals in all for Stoke that season, helping them retain their place in the Premier League.

Beattie did not start 2009–10 very well: after a number of injuries hampered his pre-season training, he left the field of play against Chelsea on a stretcher after only 10 minutes, with fears of a suspected broken ankle. X-rays revealed ankle ligament damage. Beattie recovered, and won his place back in the team, surprisingly at the expense of a resurgent Dave Kitson, and had returned to scoring ways by October. However, a dressing-room altercation between Beattie and Pulis in December 2009 resulted in the striker falling out of favour.

=== Rangers ===
Out of favour at Stoke, Beattie signed a two-year contract, with the option of a further year, with Scottish Premier League club Rangers on 13 August 2010 for £1.4 million in the summer of 2010. became the club's first permanent signing in two years due to financial constraints. Beattie made his debut for Rangers immediately after signing for the club, playing in their opening match in the Scottish Premier League against Kilmarnock.

Beattie did not feature much for Rangers, and was restricted to only five league starts in the first half of the season, due to injuries and loss of form. Unable to hold down a place in the team, he was allowed to join Blackpool on loan until the end of the season. He made his full debut on 5 February 2011, in a 5–3 defeat by his old club Everton, and went on to play nine times for the club, but failed to find the net as they sunk to relegation from the Premier League. At the end of August 2011, Rangers terminated Beattie's contract.

=== Return to Sheffield United ===
In November 2011, Beattie began training with League One club AFC Bournemouth, with manager Lee Bradbury keen to sign him. However, later that month, Beattie moved north to train with old club Sheffield United to allow manager Danny Wilson to assess his fitness. A few days later, Beattie duly re-signed for Sheffield United on a short-term contract until mid-January 2012. He was quoted in an interview with the Yorkshire Post as saying that, "if things go well, the gaffer says that he would like to keep me, and I would be interested in staying until the end of the season at least", prompting speculation that he could sign a longer-term contract. Despite this, Beattie had to wait to make a first-team appearance due to a calf injury sustained during training, eventually making his second “debut” for the Blades at the end of December 2011, coming on as an 89th-minute substitute against Notts County at Bramall Lane.

By mid-January 2012, with Beattie's contract set to expire, Danny Wilson confirmed that he would be offered an extension, hopefully keeping him at the club until the end of the season. With his future with Sheffield United still in doubt, Beattie was given a straight red card for violent conduct at Charlton Athletic, after only coming on as a substitute a few minutes earlier. Despite this disciplinary issue, it was agreed to extend his contract until the end of the season. Beattie was largely used as a substitute for the rest of his stay until he was released in May 2012 as Sheffield United failed to clinch promotion.

=== Accrington Stanley ===
Beattie joined League Two club Accrington Stanley on 9 November 2012 in a player/coach role. He made his debut on 16 November, when he came on as a 79th-minute substitute for Will Hatfield in a 1–1 draw at Barnet. On 20 November 2012, he scored a 9th-minute penalty in Stanley's 3–1 win away at Fleetwood Town, ending a 1130-day run of not having scored in a first-team match. He scored another penalty in Stanley's next match against Gillingham. Following the departure of manager Leam Richardson, Beattie expressed an interest in taking the position.

On 13 May 2013, Beattie was appointed Stanley's new manager. He left Accrington by mutual consent on 12 September 2014.

== International career ==
Beattie made five appearances and scored one goal for the England national under-21 team between 1998 and 1999.

Beattie earned his first senior England cap in a friendly against Australia, on 12 February 2003, during his most successful season with Southampton. Australia won 3–1, and the result was described (by the Australian media) as "one of the biggest upsets in soccer history". Beattie played the whole of the first half of the match, and was replaced at half-time by Francis Jeffers, who scored England's consolation goal.

Beattie's brief international career seemed to have come to a close when he was not selected for UEFA Euro 2004, the England team coach Sven-Göran Eriksson preferring Emile Heskey as the "traditional" centre-forward despite having scored five fewer goals than Beattie that season and fifteen fewer the season before.

== Coaching career ==
On 13 May 2013, Beattie was appointed as Accrington Stanley's new manager replacing Leam Richardson, but after 16 months in the post, Beattie left by mutual consent. He managed for 58 matches with a win ratio of 27.6%.

On 16 June 2015, Beattie was appointed as a first-team coach at Premier League club Swansea City, coaching the team's forwards. He joined former teammate Garry Monk's coaching staff. In December 2015, following Monk's dismissal as manager, Beattie left Swansea City alongside Pep Clotet and Kristian O'Leary.

On 1 July 2016, Beattie rejoined Clotet and Monk at Championship club Leeds United as first-team coach. With Beattie a vital part of the backroom team, Monk's Leeds side finished 7th in The Championship in 2016–17. On 25 May 2017, Monk resigned as Leeds United head coach, leaving behind his backroom staff at the club.

On 21 June 2017, Beattie followed Monk to newly relegated Championship club Middlesbrough as a first-team coach. On 23 December 2017, he was sacked along with Monk.

Beattie was appointed first-team coach of Championship club Birmingham City when Monk took over as manager in March 2018. After Monk was sacked, Beattie remained on the staff for a further season, albeit on "gardening leave", and left in August 2020 after the arrival of Aitor Karanka as manager.

Beattie joined Sheffield Wednesday as assistant manager to Monk on 12 August 2020. When Monk was sacked on 9 November 2020, Beattie left with him after just three months at the club.

On 25 June 2021, he joined Wigan Athletic as assistant manager.

On 11 May 2024, Beattie was appointed director of football at non-league club AFC Totton.

On 28 October 2025, Beattie joined Reading as a first-team coach.

== Personal life ==
His time at Southampton was marred by a conviction for drink-driving in 2002, which led to a driving ban.

Beattie is married with three children.

== Career statistics ==
=== Club ===
Appearances and goals by club, season and competition
Club	Season	League			National Cup		League Cup		Other		Total	
Club	Season	Division	Apps	Goals	Apps	Goals	Apps	Goals	Apps	Goals	Apps	Goals
Blackburn Rovers	1996–97	Premier League	1	0	0	0	1	0	—		2	0
Blackburn Rovers	1997–98	Premier League	3	0	1	0	1	0	—		5	0
Blackburn Rovers	Total		4	0	1	0	2	0	—		7	0
Southampton	1998–99	Premier League	35	5	2	0	2	1	—		39	6
Southampton	1999–2000	Premier League	18	0	1	0	3	0	—		22	0
Southampton	2000–01	Premier League	37	11	4	1	2	0	—		43	12
Southampton	2001–02	Premier League	28	12	0	0	3	2	—		31	14
Southampton	2002–03	Premier League	38	23	7	1	2	0	—		47	24
Southampton	2003–04	Premier League	37	14	1	0	2	3	2 (Note: Appearances in UEFA Cup)	0	42	17
Southampton	2004–05	Premier League	11	3	—		0	0	—		11	3
Southampton	Total		204	68	15	2	14	6	2	0	235	76
Everton	2004–05	Premier League	11	1	2	1	—		—		13	2
Everton	2005–06	Premier League	32	10	3	0	1	0	2 (Note: One appearance and one goal in UEFA Champions League, one appearance in UEFA Cup)	1	38	11
Everton	2006–07	Premier League	33	2	0	0	2	0	—		35	2
Everton	Total		76	13	5	1	3	0	2	1	86	15
Sheffield United	2007–08	Championship	39	22	2	0	0	0	—		41	22
Sheffield United	2008–09	Championship	23	12	—		1	0	—		24	12
Sheffield United	Total		62	34	2	0	1	0	0	0	65	34
Stoke City	2008–09	Premier League	16	7	—		—		—		16	7
Stoke City	2009–10	Premier League	22	3	1	0	1	0	—		24	3
Stoke City	Total		38	10	1	0	1	0	—		40	10
Rangers	2010–11	Scottish Premier League	7	0	1	0	0	0	2 (Note: Appearances in UEFA Champions League)	0	10	0
Rangers	2011–12	Scottish Premier League	0	0	—		—		0	0	0	0
Rangers	Total		7	0	1	0	0	0	2	0	10	0
Blackpool (loan)	2010–11	Premier League	9	0	—		—		—		9	0
Sheffield United	2011–12	League One	18	0	1	0	—		0	0	19	0
Accrington Stanley	2012–13	League Two	25	6	2	1	—		—		27	7
Accrington Stanley	2013–14	League Two	0	0	0	0	0	0	0	0	0	0
Accrington Stanley	Total		25	6	2	1	0	0	0	0	27	7
Career total			443	131	28	4	21	6	6	1	498	142

=== International ===
Appearances and goals by national team and year
National team	Year	Apps	Goals
England	2003	5	0
Total		5	0

== Managerial statistics ==
As of 12 September 2014

Managerial record by team and tenure
Team	From	To	Record					Ref
Team	From	To	P	W	D	L	Win %	Ref
Accrington Stanley	13 May 2013	12 September 2014	58	16	16	26	27.6	
Total			58	16	16	26	27.6	—

== Honours ==
=== As a player ===
Southampton

- FA Cup runner-up: 2002–03

Individual

- Premier League Player of the Month: December 2000, November 2002
- Football League Championship Player of the Month: August/September 2007
- Everton Goal of the Season: 2005–06
- Sheffield United Player of the Year: 2007–08
