= 2008–09 Sheffield United F.C. season =

Sheffield United F.C.
2008–09 season
- Manager: Kevin Blackwell
- Stadium: Bramall Lane
- Championship: 3rd (qualified for play-offs)
- Playoffs: Runners-up
- FA Cup: Fifth round
- League Cup: Third round
- Top goalscorer: League: James Beattie (12); All: James Beattie (12)
- Highest home attendance: 30,786 (vs. Sheffield Wednesday, 7 February 2009)
- Lowest home attendance: 23,045 (vs. Crystal Palace, 20 December 2008)
- Average home league attendance: 26,023

During the 2008–09 English football season, Sheffield United F.C. competed in the Football League Championship.

== Season summary ==
Despite the sale of the previous season's top scorer, James Beattie, to Premier League newcomers Stoke City during the season, Sheffield United improved on the previous season's unsatisfactory form and were unlucky to finish the season in third place, three points behind Birmingham City. With this third-place finish came qualification for the playoffs: after narrowly defeating Preston North End 2–1 over two legs in the semi-final, United reached the playoff final, against Burnley, at Wembley. United lost 1–0, to a 13th-minute strike from Wade Elliott, which saw United consigned to a third consecutive season in the Championship.

== Kit ==
Sheffield United continued their kit manufacturing agreement with French company Le Coq Sportif, who produced a new kit for the season, designed by United season ticket holder Ben Frost. A black away kit with silver trim, chosen by the club's players, was also introduced. The previous season's black and fluorescent green away kit was retained as the third kit.

The club ended their kit sponsorship agreement with American bank Capital One at the end of the previous season. The new kit sponsor for the season was visit Malta.com.

== Competitions ==
=== Championship ===
==== League table ====
Pos	Team	Pld	W	D	L	GF	GA	GD	Pts	Promotion, qualification or relegation
1	Wolverhampton Wanderers (C, P)	46	27	9	10	80	52	+28	90	Promotion to the Premier League
2	Birmingham City (P)	46	23	14	9	54	37	+17	83	Promotion to the Premier League
3	Sheffield United	46	22	14	10	64	39	+25	80	Qualification for Championship play-offs
4	Reading	46	21	14	11	72	40	+32	77	Qualification for Championship play-offs
5	Burnley (O, P)	46	21	13	12	72	60	+12	76	Qualification for Championship play-offs

Updated to match(es) played on 3 May 2009. Source: The Football League
Rules for classification: 1) points; 2) goal difference; 3) number of goals scored.
(C) Champions; (O) Play-off winners; (P) Promoted

==== Matches ====
Championship match details
Date	Opponent	Venue	Result F–A	Scorers	Attendance	League position	Ref.
9 August 2008	Birmingham City	Away	0–1		24,019	19th	
16 August 2008	Queens Park Rangers	Home	3–0	Sharp 3', 13', 51'	25,273	11th	
23 August 2008	Blackpool	Away	3–1	S. Quinn 21', Speed 57' pen., Halford 78'	8,611	5th	
30 August 2008	Cardiff City	Home	0–0		29,226	5th	
13 September 2008	Derby County	Away	1–2	Henderson 26'	28,473	6th	
16 September 2008	Coventry City	Home	1–1	Sharp 56'	24,130	9th	
20 September 2008	Norwich City	Away	0–1		24,175	15th	
27 September 2008	Watford	Home	2–1	Speed 1', Beattie 66'	24,427	10th	
30 September 2008	Doncaster Rovers	Away	2–0	Roberts 14' o.g., S. Quinn 60'	14,242	6th	
4 October 2008	Bristol City	Home	3–0	Beattie 45', 69', Fontaine 56' o.g.	24,712	4th	
19 October 2008	Sheffield Wednesday	Away	0–1		30,441	6th	
21 October 2008	Southampton	Home	0–0		25,642	7th	
25 October 2008	Preston North End	Home	1–0	Ehiogu 50'	24,445	5th	
28 October 2008	Bristol City	Away	0–0		16,798	6th	
1 November 2008	Plymouth Argyle	Home	2–0	Beattie 49' pen., 57'	25,601	5th	
8 November 2008	Barnsley	Away	2–1	Beattie 20', 85' pen.	19,002	4th	
15 November 2008	Reading	Home	0–2		25,065	5th	
22 November 2008	Charlton Athletic	Away	5–2	Beattie 7', Speed 29', Kilgallon 45', Youga 48' o.g., S. Quinn 53'	20,328	4th	
25 November 2008	Wolverhampton Wanderers	Home	1–3	Spring 75'	27,111	4th	
29 November 2008	Ipswich Town	Away	1–1	Beattie 90' pen.	19,785	5th	
6 December 2008	Burnley	Home	2–3	Beattie 36' pen., S. Quinn 87'	24,702	6th	
9 December 2008	Nottingham Forest	Away	1–0	Howard 31'	19,541	5th	
13 December 2008	Swansea City	Away	1–1	Morgan 87'	14,744	7th	
20 December 2008	Crystal Palace	Home	2–2	Dyer 41', Beattie 88' pen.	23,045	6th	
26 December 2008	Wolverhampton Wanderers	Away	1–1	Beattie 22'	27,106	8th	
28 December 2008	Charlton Athletic	Home	3–1	S. Quinn 65', 79', Webber 72'	24,717	6th	
10 January 2009	Norwich City	Home	1–0	Henderson 17'	27,267	4th	
17 January 2009	Watford	Away	2–0	Webber 52', Henderson 67'	14,555	4th	
27 January 2009	Doncaster Rovers	Home	0–1		26,555	4th	
31 January 2009	Preston North End	Away	0–0		14,889	5th	
3 February 2009	Southampton	Away	2–1	Halford 35', Ward 90'	13,257	4th	
7 February 2009	Sheffield Wednesday	Home	1–2	Lupoli 5'	30,786	5th	
21 February 2009	Plymouth Argyle	Away	2–2	Webber 63', Halford 72'	10,044	6th	
1 March 2009	Birmingham City	Home	2–1	Webber 44', Cotterill 83' pen.	24,232	5th	
4 March 2009	Coventry City	Away	2–1	Bromby 45', Morgan 54'	16,300	4th	
7 March 2009	Queens Park Rangers	Away	0–0		13,718	5th	
10 March 2009	Blackpool	Home	2–2	Coid 5 o.g., Cotterill 73 pen.	25,273	4th	
14 March 2009	Derby County	Home	4–2	Naughton 7', Henderson 21', 62', Beattie 90'	27,565	4th	
22 March 2009	Cardiff City	Away	3–0	Cotterill 25' pen., Ward 46', S. Quinn 87'	17,942	4th	
4 April 2009	Ipswich Town	Home	2–0	Halford 19', Henderson 27'	25,315	4th	
7 April 2009	Barnsley	Home	2–1	O'Toole 82', Lupoli 87'	27,061	3rd	
10 April 2009	Reading	Away	1–0	Howard 59'	20,756	2nd	
13 April 2009	Nottingham Forest	Home	0–0		28,374	3rd	
20 April 2009	Burnley	Away	0–1		14,884	3rd	
25 April 2009	Swansea City	Home	1–0	Cotterill 37' pen.	28,010	3rd	
3 May 2009	Crystal Palace	Away	0–0		22,824	3rd	

==== Play-offs ====
Play-off match details
Round	Date	Opponent	Venue	Result F–A	Scorers	Attendance	Ref.
Semi-final first leg	8 May 2009	Preston North End	Away	1–1	Howard 46'	19,840	
Semi-final second leg	11 May 2009	Preston North End	Home	1–0 (2–1 agg.)	Halford 59'	26,354	
Final	25 May 2009	Burnley	Neutral	0–1		80,518	

=== FA Cup ===
FA Cup match details
Round	Date	Opponent	Venue	Result F–A	Scorers	Attendance	Ref.
Third round	13 January 2009	Leyton Orient	Away	4–1	Halford 59', 78', Sharp 62', Naughton 69'	4,527	
Fourth round	24 January 2009	Charlton Athletic	Home	2–1	Webber 26', Hendrie 62'	15,957	
Fifth round	14 February 2009	Hull City	Home	1–1	Halford 7'	22,283	
Fifth round replay	26 February 2009	Hull City	Away	1–2	Sharp 32'	17,239	

=== League Cup ===
League Cup match details
Round	Date	Opponent	Venue	Result F–A	Scorers	Attendance	Ref.
First round	13 August 2008	Port Vale	Home	3–1	Hendrie 41', S. Quinn 71', Webber 90' pen.	7,694	
Second round	27 August 2008	Huddersfield Town	Away	2–1	Henderson 82', Naughton 83'	15,189	
Third round	23 September 2008	Arsenal	Away	0–6		56,632	

== Players ==
=== First-team squad ===
Squad at end of season

Note: Flags indicate national team as defined under FIFA eligibility rules; some limited exceptions apply. Players may hold more than one non-FIFA nationality.

No.	Pos.	Nation	Player
1	GK	IRL	Paddy Kenny (Note: Kenny was born in Halifax, England, but also qualified to represent the Republic of Ireland internationally through his parents and made his international debut for the Republic of Ireland in June 2004.)
2	DF	ENG	Greg Halford (on loan from Sunderland)
3	DF	SCO	Gary Naysmith
4	MF	WAL	David Cotterill
5	DF	ENG	Chris Morgan
6	DF	ENG	Matthew Kilgallon
7	FW	ENG	Darius Henderson
9	FW	ITA	Arturo Lupoli (on loan from Fiorentina)
10	FW	ENG	Danny Webber
11	MF	ENG	Lee Hendrie
12	DF	CHN	Sun Jihai
13	GK	ENG	Ian Bennett
15	MF	WAL	Gary Speed
17	MF	SCO	Nick Montgomery (Note: Montgomery was born in Leeds, England, but also qualified to represent Scotland internationally and represented them at U-21 level.)
18	MF	NIR	Jamie Ward (Note: Ward was born in Birmingham, England, but also qualified to represent Northern Ireland internationally through his grandfather and represented them at U-18 and U-21 level before making his international debut for Northern Ireland in August 2011.)

No.	Pos.	Nation	Player
19	FW	SCO	Craig Beattie (on loan from West Bromwich Albion)
20	MF	ENG	Brian Howard
21	MF	IRL	John-Joe O'Toole (Note: O'Toole was born in Harrow, England, but also qualified to represent the Republic of Ireland internationally through his grandparents and represented them at U-21 level.) (on loan from Watford)
22	GK	MLT	Justin Haber
24	FW	ENG	Billy Sharp
25	MF	ALG	Aymen Tahar
26	DF	ENG	Derek Geary
27	MF	IRL	Keith Quinn
28	MF	IRL	Stephen Quinn
30	DF	ENG	Kyle Naughton
31	MF	POL	Ben Starosta (Note: Starosta was born in Sheffield, England, but also qualified to represent Poland internationally through his grandfather and represented them at U-20 level.)
32	DF	ENG	Leigh Bromby (on loan from Watford)
33	DF	ENG	Ugo Ehiogu
34	DF	ENG	Kyle Walker

=== Out on loan ===
Note: Flags indicate national team as defined under FIFA eligibility rules; some limited exceptions apply. Players may hold more than one non-FIFA nationality.

No. / Pos. / Nation / Player; 14 / DF / AUS / David Carney (on loan at Norwich City)	No. / Pos. / Nation / Player; 29 / FW / ENG / Jordan Robertson (on loan to Ferencváros)

=== Left club during season ===
Note: Flags indicate national team as defined under FIFA eligibility rules; some limited exceptions apply. Players may hold more than one non-FIFA nationality.

No.	Pos.	Nation	Player
8	FW	ENG	Jon Stead (to Ipswich Town)
8	FW	IRL	Anthony Stokes (on loan from Sunderland)
9	FW	ENG	James Beattie (to Stoke City)
18	MF	ENG	Michael Tonge (to Stoke City)

No.	Pos.	Nation	Player
18	FW	ENG	Nathan Dyer (on loan from Southampton)
19	MF	NIR	Keith Gillespie (released)
20	DF	SCO	Chris Armstrong (Note: Armstrong was born in Newcastle upon Tyne, England, and represented England at U-20 level, but also qualified to represent Scotland internationally through his grandmother and represented them at B level.) (to Reading)
25	MF	ENG	Matthew Spring (on loan from Luton Town)

== Statistics ==
=== Appearances and goals ===
No.	Pos	Nat	Player	Total		Championship		Play-offs		FA Cup		League Cup	
No.	Pos	Nat	Player	Apps	Goals	Apps	Goals	Apps	Goals	Apps	Goals	Apps	Goals
Goalkeepers
1	GK	(Republic of Ireland) IRL	Paddy Kenny	50	0	44	0	3	0	2	0	1	0
13	GK	(England) ENG	Ian Bennett	6	0	2	0	0	0	2	0	2	0
Defenders
2	DF	(England) ENG	Greg Halford	49	8	31+10	4	3	1	4	3	1	0
3	DF	(Scotland) SCO	Gary Naysmith	43	0	37+2	0	0	0	3	0	1	0
5	DF	(England) ENG	Chris Morgan	50	2	40+1	2	3	0	4	0	2	0
6	DF	(England) ENG	Matthew Kilgallon	49	1	39+1	1	3	0	3	0	3	0
12	DF	(China) CHN	Sun Jihai	17	1	11+1	1	0	0	3+1	0	1	0
26	DF	(Republic of Ireland) IRL	Derek Geary	3	0	0+1	0	0	0	0	0	2	0
30	DF	(England) ENG	Kyle Naughton	50	3	39+1	1	3	0	3+1	1	0+3	1
32	DF	(England) ENG	Leigh Bromby	13	1	6+6	1	0+1	0	0	0	0	0
33	DF	(England) ENG	Ugo Ehiogu	17	1	11+5	1	0	0	0	0	1	0
34	DF	(England) ENG	Kyle Walker	7	0	2	0	3	0	2	0	0	0
Midfielders
4	MF	(Wales) WAL	David Cotterill	32	4	17+7	4	2	0	3	0	3	0
11	MF	(England) ENG	Lee Hendrie	12	2	0+5	0	0+1	0	2+2	1	1+1	1
15	MF	(Wales) WAL	Gary Speed	18	3	17	3	0	0	0	0	1	0
17	MF	(Scotland) SCO	Nick Montgomery	35	0	26+2	0	3	0	3	0	1	0
18	MF	(Northern Ireland) NIR	Jamie Ward	18	2	7+9	2	1+1	0	0	0	0	0
20	MF	(England) ENG	Brian Howard	32	3	22+4	2	3	1	1+2	0	0	0
21	MF	(Republic of Ireland) IRL	John-Joe O'Toole	9	1	5+4	1	0	0	0	0	0	0
25	MF	(Algeria) ALG	Aymen Tahar	1	0	0	0	0	0	0+1	0	0	0
28	MF	(Republic of Ireland) IRL	Stephen Quinn	50	8	43	7	3	0	2	0	2	1
Forwards
7	FW	(England) ENG	Darius Henderson	37	7	25+7	6	1	0	2	0	2	1
9	FW	(Italy) ITA	Arturo Lupoli	11	2	2+7	2	0+2	0	0	0	0	0
10	FW	(England) ENG	Danny Webber	41	6	21+15	4	0	0	1+1	1	2+1	1
19	FW	(Scotland) SCO	Craig Beattie	16	1	1+12	1	2+1	0	0	0	0	0
24	FW	(England) ENG	Billy Sharp	27	6	17+5	4	0	0	4	2	0+1	0
Players left during the season
8	FW	(England) ENG	Jon Stead	2	0	0+1	0	0	0	0	0	1	0
8	FW	(Republic of Ireland) IRL	Anthony Stokes	13	0	5+7	0	0	0	0	0	1	0
9	FW	(England) ENG	James Beattie	24	12	21+2	12	0	0	0	0	1	0
14	DF	(Australia) AUS	David Carney	1	0	0	0	0	0	0	0	1	0
18	MF	(England) ENG	Michael Tonge	5	0	4	0	0	0	0	0	1	0
18	FW	(England) ENG	Nathan Dyer	7	1	3+4	1	0	0	0	0	0	0
19	MF	(Northern Ireland) NIR	Keith Gillespie	1	0	0+1	0	0	0	0	0	0	0
20	DF	(Scotland) SCO	Chris Armstrong	1	0	0	0	0	0	0	0	1	0
25	FW	(England) ENG	Matthew Spring	13	1	8+3	1	0	0	0	0	2	0

== Transfers ==
=== In ===
Date	Position	Name	Club From	Fee	Reference
2 July 2008	DF	Sun Jihai	Manchester City	Free	
23 July 2008	FW	Darius Henderson	Watford	£2,000,000	
31 July 2008	MF	David Cotterill	Wigan Athletic	Undisclosed	
31 July 2008	GK	Justin Haber	Haidari F.C.	Free	
19 January 2009	MF	Jamie Ward	Chesterfield	£400,000	

=== Out ===
Date	Position	Name	Club To	Fee	Reference
4 July 2008	DF	Chris Lucketti	Huddersfield Town	Free	
21 July 2008	FW	Rob Hulse	Derby County	£1,750,000	
24 July 2008	FW	Luton Shelton	Valerenga	£1,000,000	
2 September 2008	MF	Michael Tonge	Stoke City	£2,000,000	
15 September 2008	FW	Jon Stead	Ipswich Town	Undisclosed	
12 January 2009	FW	James Beattie	Stoke City	£3,500,000	
30 January 2009	MF	Keith Gillespie	None	Released	

=== Loan In ===
Date	Position	Name	Club From	Length	Reference
2 July 2008	DF	Greg Halford	Sunderland	Full-Season	
31 July 2008	MF	Matthew Spring	Luton Town	Full-Season (ended 9 January)	
2 February 2009	FW	Arturo Lupoli	Fiorentina	Until end of season	

=== Loan Out ===
Date	Position	Name	Club To	Length	Reference
23 July 2008	DF	Ben Starosta	Aldershot Town	One Month	
1 September 2008	FW	Jon Stead	Ipswich Town	Six Months (made permanent 15 September)	
2 September 2008	DF	Ben Starosta	Lechia Gdansk	Six Months	
28 January 2009	MF	David Carney	Norwich City	Until end of season	
