= James McFadden =

Scottish association football player

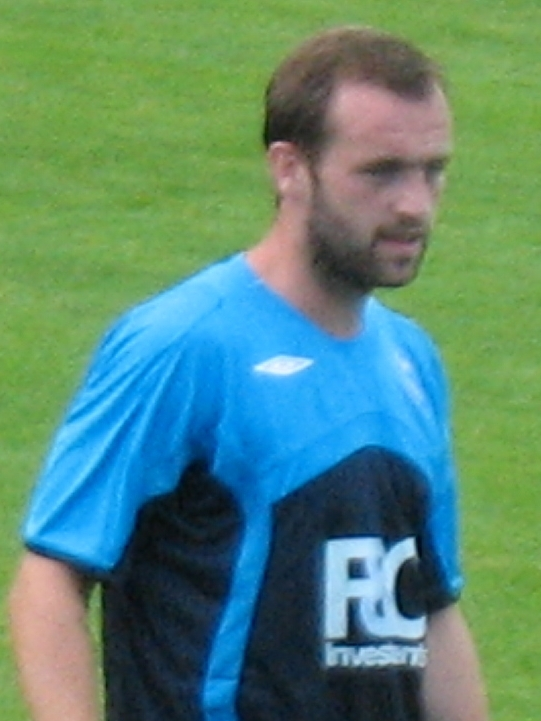
- McFadden in 2009

Personal information
- Full name: James Henry McFadden
- Date of birth: 14 April 1983 (age 43)
- Place of birth: Glasgow, Scotland
- Height: 5 ft 10 in (1.78 m)
- Position: Forward

Youth career
- 1998–2000: Motherwell

Senior career*
Years	Team	Apps	(Gls)
2000–2003	Motherwell	63	(26)
2003–2008	Everton	109	(11)
2008–2011	Birmingham City	82	(13)
2011–2012	Everton	7	(0)
2012–2013	Sunderland	3	(0)
2013–2014	Motherwell	40	(9)
2014–2015	St Johnstone	16	(1)
2015–2017	Motherwell	9	(2)
2017–2018	Queen of the South	11	(0)
Total		340	(62)

International career
2002–2010	Scotland	48	(14)

Managerial career
- 2016–2017: Motherwell (assistant)
- 2018–2019: Scotland (assistant)
- * Club domestic league appearances and goals

James Henry McFadden (born 14 April 1983) is a Scottish former professional football player and coach who now works as a football pundit.

A forward, McFadden started his playing career with Motherwell, where he came to prominence in the 2002–03 season by scoring 19 goals and winning the Scottish PFA Young Player of the Year award. Everton signed McFadden for £1.25 million in 2003. McFadden struggled to hold down a regular place in the Everton first-team and moved to Birmingham City for £5 million in January 2008. A serious injury meant that McFadden missed most of the 2010–11 season and the Blues, who were relegated in his absence, decided not to renew his contract. McFadden signed again for the Toffees on a free transfer in October 2011, after regaining his fitness, and spent three months with Sunderland in 2012.

Towards the end of his playing career, McFadden had two further spells at Motherwell, either side of a year at St Johnstone. During his third stint with Motherwell, McFadden also took on coaching duties. After a brief spell playing for Queen of the South, McFadden took a coaching position with the Scotland team.

McFadden was first capped by Scotland in 2002. His goal in a Euro 2008 qualification match on 12 September 2007 against France in the Parc des Princes, which gave Scotland a 1–0 win, is regarded as one of the team's most famous goals. McFadden played 48 times for Scotland, scoring 15 goals, in total. He was appointed to an assistant coach position with the Scotland national team in March 2018.

== Club career ==
=== Motherwell (first spell) ===
McFadden was raised in Springburn, Glasgow and attended Turnbull High School in Bishopbriggs. His parents operate a fish and chips takeaway in Glasgow city centre. He joined the Motherwell youth system at a young age, making his first-team debut when he was 17 years old. McFadden came to greater prominence during the 2002–03 Scottish Premier League SPL season, scoring 19 goals from 34 starts and winning the Young Player of the Year Award.

In this season Motherwell finished bottom of the SPL and should have been relegated but were given a reprieve due to First Division champions Falkirk not meeting stadium criteria.

McFadden received some criticism for his lack of discipline, picking up fifteen yellow cards and one red during the campaign. McFadden's final game for Motherwell that season saw him score a hat-trick in a 6–2 defeat of Livingston at Fir Park.

=== Everton (first spell) ===
English Premier League club Everton signed McFadden in 2003 for £1.25 million. McFadden scored his debut goal for Everton during their 5–2 defeat at Tottenham Hotspur on 1 January 2005, more than a year after joining the club. One week later, he scored his second goal in a third-round FA Cup tie versus Plymouth Argyle.

During the 2005–06 season, McFadden was in and out of the Everton team as they struggled to re-capture their form of the previous season. On 11 March 2006, he scored with a 35-yard volley to help Everton to a 3–1 victory over Fulham. This scoring run of form continued the next week versus Aston Villa, a half-volley from just outside the area helping the Toffees to a 4–1 victory and ended the season with seven goals.

McFadden made an indifferent start to the 2006–07 season, following the arrival of record signing Andrew Johnson, managing only two goals in the first half of the campaign. On 24 January 2007, McFadden injured his fifth metatarsal during training for Everton. After nearly three months on the sidelines, he made a scoring return to action for Everton as a second-half substitute versus Charlton Athletic on 15 April 2007. McFadden scored a spectacular volley in injury time to secure a 2–1 win for the Toffees, a goal later voted goal of the season in a poll on the skysports.com website.

In October 2007, McFadden scored a critical equalising goal in Everton's victory over Metalist Kharkiv in the UEFA Cup. He dedicated his goal against Middlesbrough on 2 January 2008 to the recently deceased Phil O'Donnell, by pointing to his black armband and then to the sky in tribute to the former Motherwell captain.

=== Birmingham City ===
On 18 January 2008, McFadden joined Birmingham City on a three-and-a-half-year deal, with an option for additional two years, for an initial fee of £5 million, potentially rising to £6m depending on appearances. McFadden's first goal arrived in his fourth game for the club, a penalty kick versus West Ham United at Upton Park, after he had been fouled by Lucas Neill. In his next match, at home to Arsenal, he scored from a 20-yard free kick before adding the equalising goal from the penalty spot in the last minute of stoppage time.

McFadden scored Birmingham's first goal of the 2009–10 Premier League season, a 92nd-minute penalty, to give the club a 1–0 home win against Portsmouth.

McFadden suffered anterior cruciate ligament damage in September 2010. He returned to training in March 2011, but suffered a setback which meant he could not play in the 2010–11 season. Following their relegation from the Premier League, Birmingham chose not to take up a two-year option on his contract but attempted to negotiate amended terms. No agreement was reached, and McFadden left Birmingham after his contract expired on 30 June 2011.

=== Everton (second spell) ===
After continuing to train with Birmingham over the summer to regain fitness while out of contract, McFadden had a successful trial with Wolverhampton Wanderers in September, but was unable to agree contract terms. In mid-October he was reported to be in talks with Celtic, but on 17 October, McFadden signed for Everton until the end of the 2011–12 season. McFadden played in a reserve team match the following day, his first appearance since a knee injury 13 months earlier and made his second debut for the first team on 5 November as an 81st-minute substitute in a 2–1 defeat away to Newcastle United. McFadden had to wait until April 2012 to make his first start, playing the first 64 minutes in a 4–0 league win over Sunderland but was released by the club at the end of the season, having played a total of eight first-team matches during his short return to Goodison Park.

Again out of contract, McFadden trained with Motherwell during the 2012–13 pre-season, playing for the club in a testimonial match for Steven Hammell on 21 July 2012 against Everton. Contract speculation followed when Motherwell manager Stuart McCall made an approach to sign McFadden. However, the approach to sign McFadden was unsuccessful as no agreement could be met.

=== Sunderland ===
In September 2012, McFadden undertook a trial with Sunderland. On 26 October, he joined Sunderland on a three-month contract that ended in January 2013. McFadden's debut was on 15 December 2012, in a 3–1 defeat to Manchester United at Old Trafford and his home debut was on 12 January 2013 in a 3–0 victory versus West Ham United.

=== Motherwell (second spell) ===
After failing to earn a new deal at Sunderland, McFadden again trained with former club Motherwell. On 18 February 2013, McFadden returned to Fir Park, signing on until the end of the season. McFadden made his first start on his return in a 2–1 win over Celtic. On Friday 15 March 2013, McFadden scored his first goal since returning in a 4–1 victory over Hibernian and also set up two goals during the match. McFadden's performance earned him the man-of-the-match award. McFadden then scored the late equaliser in a 2–2 draw versus St Mirren on 6 April 2013 and then on 5 May 2013, scored a brace despite losing 4–3 versus Inverness Caledonian Thistle. At the end of the 2012–13 season, although McFadden was offered a new contract his future still remained uncertain.

At the start of pre-season training for the 2013–14 season, McFadden returned to the club and travelled with them to their training camp in Spain. In a 4–2 defeat versus Newcastle United in a friendly match, McFadden scored a penalty with an audacious chip down the centre of the goal, known as a Panenka. After the match, reports suggested that McFadden would remain at Motherwell on a one-year deal. On 19 July 2013, it was confirmed that McFadden had signed a new contract in a decision that he described as "straightforward".

At the start of the 2013–14 season, McFadden started as a traditional right winger but soon afterwards his form and fitness slumped, having scored only once versus Livingston in the last sixteen of the Scottish League Cup. McFadden then suffered a back injury but returned soon after to score his first league goal of the season in a 5–1 win over Partick Thistle on 29 December 2013 and followed this up his second league goal in the next match, in a 4–0 victory over St Johnstone. After these two games, McFadden says his performance revived his form and he went on to score and provide three assists, on 1 March 2014 as Motherwell defeated Hearts. McFadden's fourth goal arrived on 22 March 2014 in a 2–1 victory over Ross County.

At the end of the 2013–14 season, McFadden was released by the club after they decided not to extend his contract after citing a risk over McFadden's recurring injury problems, even though he had expressed his desire to sign a new contract two months previously.

=== St Johnstone ===
On 1 October 2014, McFadden signed for St Johnstone until the end of the 2014–15 season and had his debut on 4 October 2014 in a 2–1 defeat versus St Mirren. On 22 November 2014, McFadden scored his first goal for the Perth club in a 2–1 win versus Ross County. In May 2015, McFadden was released after only scoring one league goal during his season in Perthshire.

As of September 2015, McFadden was training with Motherwell. Two months later, he entered negotiations to be the marquee player of Indian Super League club Kerala Blasters, after the departure of Carlos Marchena.

=== Motherwell (third spell) ===
On 18 December 2015, McFadden signed a short-term deal until the end of January 2016. That arrangement expired at the end of January, with McFadden expecting to move on to the USA. On 13 February, McFadden signed a new deal to stay to the end of the season. On 19 March, he was ruled out for the remainder of the 2015–16 season, after suffering a broken ankle in training. On 26 July 2016, Motherwell announced that McFadden had been appointed as the club's assistant-manager, whilst also continuing as a player until the summer of 2017.

Nearly seventeen years after making his Motherwell debut, and nearly sixteen after scoring his first league goal, McFadden came on as a second-half substitute in Motherwell's final game of the 2016–17 season versus Inverness Caledonian Thistle and scored his final Motherwell goal in his final appearance. The match ended in a 3–2 win for the Scottish Highlands club. McFadden departed Motherwell at the end of the season, as their manager Stephen Robinson opted for a new coaching set-up.

On 13 November 2019, it was announced that McFadden was to be inducted into the Motherwell Hall of Fame.

=== Queen of the South ===
On 8 September 2017, McFadden signed for Dumfries club Queen of the South on a short-term contract. McFadden departed Queens in January 2018, after 15 appearances for the club.

== International career ==
McFadden gained his first Scotland cap at the age of 19 against South Africa on a Far East tour, at the end of which a night out drinking caused him to miss his flight home. Despite his domestic performances he became a regular in Berti Vogts' Scotland set-up, scoring his first goal against the Faroe Islands during a 3–1 win in a UEFA Euro 2004 qualifying match at Hampden Park on 6 September 2003.

McFadden's goal versus Netherlands in November 2003 gave Scotland a famous 1–0 victory, although they then lost 6–0 in Amsterdam and failed to qualify for UEFA Euro 2004. McFadden was part of the squad which went out to Japan in 2006 and won the Kirin Cup.

In September 2007, during Scotland's dramatic but ultimately unsuccessful qualifying campaign for UEFA Euro 2008, McFadden scored a long-range goal from 30 yards to secure a famous 1–0 win over France in Paris, securing Scotland's first win on French soil since 1950. He was on target again in the following game a month later, a 3–1 win over Ukraine at Hampden Park. He was unable to score in the last match of the campaign against Italy in November 2007 at Hampden, which Scotland lost 2–1.

The winning goal in a September 2008 match against Iceland in the 2010 World Cup qualifying campaign, scored on the rebound after McFadden's penalty kick was saved, was initially credited to McFadden, but in the official match report was awarded to Barry Robson. The SFA lobbied on McFadden's behalf, and in March 2009, FIFA re-credited the goal to him.

McFadden was substituted at half-time in a UEFA Euro 2012 qualification match against Liechtenstein in September 2010, and was criticised by manager Craig Levein after the game. McFadden suffered a serious injury soon afterwards. He criticised Levein in February 2012 for describing him as "lazy". In March 2013 new Scotland manager Gordon Strachan said that he would consider McFadden for selection, but noted that he needed to play regularly at club level, having not done so in the previous two seasons.

== Coaching career ==
Alex McLeish appointed McFadden to an assistant coaching position with the Scotland national team in March 2018. McLeish and his backroom staff, including McFadden, were dismissed on 18 April 2019.

== Career statistics ==
=== Club ===
Appearances and goals by club, season and competition
Club	Season	League			National cup (Note: Includes Scottish Cup, FA Cup)		League cup (Note: Includes Scottish League Cup, Football League Cup)		Europe		Other		Total	
Club	Season	Division	Apps	Goals	Apps	Goals	Apps	Goals	Apps	Goals	Apps	Goals	Apps	Goals
Motherwell	2000–01	Scottish Premier League	6	0	1	0	0	0	―		―		7	0
Motherwell	2001–02	Scottish Premier League	24	10	1	0	0	0	―		―		25	10
Motherwell	2002–03	Scottish Premier League	30	13	4	5	1	1	―		―		35	19
Motherwell	2003–04	Scottish Premier League	3	3	―		―		―		―		3	3
Motherwell	Total		63	26	6	5	1	1	―		―		70	32
Everton	2003–04	Premier League	23	0	1	0	3	0	―		―		27	0
Everton	2004–05	Premier League	23	1	3	2	3	0	―		―		29	3
Everton	2005–06	Premier League	32	6	4	1	1	0	4 (Note: Two appearances in the UEFA Champions League, two appearances in the UEFA Cup)	0	―		41	7
Everton	2006–07	Premier League	19	2	0	0	2	1	―		―		21	3
Everton	2007–08	Premier League	12	2	1	0	3	2	5 (Note: Appearances in the UEFA Cup)	1	―		21	5
Everton	Total		109	11	9	3	12	3	9	1	―		139	18
Birmingham City	2007–08	Premier League	12	4	―		―		―		―		12	4
Birmingham City	2008–09	Championship	30	4	0	0	0	0	―		―		30	4
Birmingham City	2009–10	Premier League	36	5	4	0	1	0	―		―		41	5
Birmingham City	2010–11	Premier League	4	0	0	0	1	1	―		―		5	1
Birmingham City	Total		82	13	4	0	2	1	―		―		88	14
Everton	2011–12	Premier League	7	0	1	0	0	0	―		―		8	0
Sunderland	2012–13	Premier League	3	0	0	0	0	0	―		―		3	0
Motherwell	2012–13	Scottish Premier League	13	5	―		―		―		―		13	5
Motherwell	2013–14	Scottish Premiership	27	4	1	0	1	1	1	0	―		30	5
Motherwell	Total		40	9	1	0	1	1	1	0	―		43	10
St Johnstone	2014–15	Scottish Premiership	16	1	2	1	1	0	―		―		19	2
Motherwell	2015–16	Scottish Premiership	3	0	1	0	0	0	―		―		4	0
Motherwell	2016–17	Scottish Premiership	6	2	0	0	0	0	―		―		6	2
Motherwell	Total		9	2	1	0	0	0	―		―		10	2
Queen of the South	2017–18	Scottish Championship	11	0	2	0	0	0	―		2 (Note: Appearances in the Scottish Challenge Cup)	0	15	0
Career total			340	62	26	9	17	6	10	1	2	0	395	78

=== International ===
Appearances and goals by national team and year
National team	Year	Apps	Goals
Scotland	2002	2	0
Scotland	2003	7	2
Scotland	2004	10	4
Scotland	2005	5	2
Scotland	2006	7	2
Scotland	2007	6	3
Scotland	2008	5	1
Scotland	2009	3	1
Scotland	2010	3	0
Total		48	14

Scores and results list Scotland's goal tally first, score column indicates score after each McFadden goal.

List of international goals scored by James McFadden
No.	Date	Venue	Opponent	Score	Result	Competition
1	6 September 2003	Glasgow, Scotland	Faroe Islands	3–1	3–1	UEFA Euro 2004 qualifying
2	15 November 2003	Glasgow, Scotland	Netherlands	1–0	1–0	UEFA Euro 2004 play-off
3	31 March 2004	Glasgow, Scotland	Romania	1–2	1–2	Friendly
4	27 May 2004	Tallinn, Estonia	Estonia	1–0	1–0	Friendly
5	3 September 2004	Valencia, Spain	Spain	1–0 (Note: The match was abandoned after floodlight failure and heavy rain in the second half, but the SFA still recognise McFadden's goal.)	1–1	Friendly
6	17 November 2004	Edinburgh, Scotland	Sweden	1–3	1–4	Friendly
7	4 June 2005	Glasgow, Scotland	Moldova	2–0	2–0	2006 FIFA World Cup qualifying
8	12 October 2005	Celje, Slovenia	Slovenia	2–0	3–0	2006 FIFA World Cup qualifying
9	11 May 2006	Kobe, Japan	Bulgaria	3–1	5–1	Kirin Cup
10	2 September 2006	Glasgow, Scotland	Faroe Islands	2–0	6–0	UEFA Euro 2008 qualifying
11	8 September 2007	Glasgow, Scotland	Lithuania	3–1	3–1	UEFA Euro 2008 qualifying
12	12 September 2007	Paris, France	France	1–0	1–0	UEFA Euro 2008 qualifying
13	13 October 2007	Glasgow, Scotland	Ukraine	3–1	3–1	UEFA Euro 2008 qualifying
14	10 September 2008	Reykjavík, Iceland	Iceland	2–0	2–1	2010 FIFA World Cup qualifying
15	5 September 2009	Glasgow, Scotland	Macedonia	2–0	2–0	2010 FIFA World Cup qualifying

== Honours ==
Birmingham City

- Football League Cup: 2010–11

Scotland

- Kirin Cup: 2006

Individual

- SFWA Young Player of the Year: 2001–02
- PFA Scotland Young Player of the Year: 2002–03
- Everton Young Player of the Year: 2005–06
- Everton Goal of the Season: 2006–07
- SPL Young Player of the Month: January 2002
- SFWA International Player of the Year: 2007–08
