= Iain Turner =

Scottish footballer and coach (born 1984)

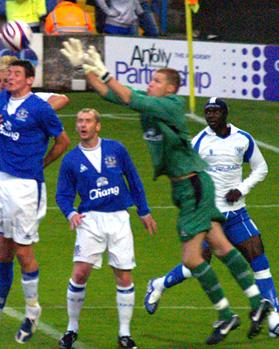
- Turner playing for Everton

Personal information
- Full name: Iain Robert Turner
- Date of birth: 26 January 1984 (age 42)
- Place of birth: Stirling, Scotland
- Height: 1.93 m (6 ft 4 in)
- Position: Goalkeeper

Youth career
- 1996-1998: Riverside Boys Club KippenFC

Senior career*
Years	Team	Apps	(Gls)
2002–2003	Stirling Albion	13	(0)
2003–2011	Everton	4	(0)
2004	→ Chester City (loan)	12	(0)
2005	→ Doncaster Rovers (loan)	8	(0)
2005	→ Wycombe Wanderers (loan)	3	(0)
2006	→ Crystal Palace (loan)	5	(0)
2007	→ Sheffield Wednesday (loan)	11	(0)
2009	→ Nottingham Forest (loan)	3	(0)
2010	→ Coventry City (loan)	2	(0)
2011	→ Preston North End (loan)	17	(0)
2011–2012	Preston North End	11	(1)
2012	→ Dunfermline Athletic (loan)	4	(0)
2014	Barnsley	0	(0)
2014–2015	Sheffield United	11	(0)
2015–2017	Tranmere Rovers	1	(0)
2017–2018	Southport	8	(0)
Total		113	(1)

International career
2004–2005	Scotland U21	6	(0)
2004	Scotland B	1	(0)
- * Club domestic league appearances and goals

Iain Robert Turner (born 26 January 1984) is a Scottish former professional footballer, who played as a goalkeeper and who works as goalkeeping coach at Tranmere Rovers. He represented the Scotland under-21 team, the Scotland B team and been selected for the full Scotland squad. Turner previously played for Stirling Albion, Barnsley, Everton and several other clubs on loan.

== Club career ==
Born in Stirling, Turner arrived at Everton after impressing with his local team, Stirling Albion, signing for £50,000 in March 2003. The Scotland under-21 international, also capped at under-16 and under-18 level, has spent time gaining experience on loan at Chester City (where he won a Conference National championship medal in 2004), Doncaster Rovers, Wycombe Wanderers and Crystal Palace.

Turner found national fame when he was sent off after only nine minutes during his Premier League debut for the Toffees against Blackburn Rovers, after picking up a header from one of his own defenders, Alan Stubbs, outside the penalty area.

He signed for Sheffield Wednesday on a month's loan in February 2007 making his debut at home in the win against Southend United on 24 February 2007. Prior to Turner signing for Sheffield Wednesday, the club had failed to win in nine games. His arrival at the club sparked an upturn in form, and he helped them to avoid defeat in each of the eleven games in which he played during his loan spell. In March 2009 Turner signed for Nottingham Forest on loan until the end of the 2008–09 season. During his spell at Forest, Turner saved a penalty hit by Jamal Campbell-Ryce in a league match between Forest and Barnsley. In August 2010 he signed on a month emergency loan to Coventry City as back-up to Keiren Westwood. Turner signed for Preston North End on a 93-day emergency loan on 9 February 2011, replacing Andy Lonergan, the regular Preston goalkeeper.

After Lonergan left Preston to join Leeds United, Turner signed a one-year contract with Preston on 29 July 2011. On 27 August 2011, Turner scored his first ever career goal in the 86th minute of a league match against Notts County, sending a long ball bouncing over the head of his opposite number Stuart Nelson. Turner suffered an injury to his foot on 3 November 2011. Preston then signed a new goalkeeper from Germany, Thorsten Stuckmann, who kept Turner out of the first team when he returned from injury. Turner was loaned to Dunfermline Athletic in January 2012, but this contract was cancelled after he suffered an injury in training. In May 2012, Turner was released from the club after being told his contract would not be renewed.

On 30 January 2014, Turner signed a short-term contract with Barnsley.

On 15 August 2014, Turner signed a six-month contract with Sheffield United. Turner made his Blades début on 7 October 2014 as the Blades won 2–1 away at Hartlepool United in the Football League Trophy. Despite being Sheffield United's second choice goalkeeper, he made several more appearances for the Blades and made some excellent saves in a 2–0 victory over Swindon Town in January 2015.

In July 2017 he signed for Southport as a player and goalkeeping coach.

== International career ==
Turner represented the Scotland B side in May 2009. He was called up to the full Scotland squad in August 2010 as a replacement for the injured David Marshall. He was sometimes selected for the squad under the management of Craig Levein, but did not play.

== Career statistics ==
As of match played 26 December 2017

Appearances and goals by club, season and competition
Club	Season	League			FA Cup		League Cup		Other		Total	
Club	Season	Division	Apps	Goals	Apps	Goals	Apps	Goals	Apps	Goals	Apps	Goals
Stirling Albion	2002–03	Scottish Third Division	13	0	0	0	0	0	0	0	13	0
Everton	2003–04	Premier League	0	0	0	0	0	0	0	0	0	0
Everton	2004–05	Premier League	0	0	0	0	0	0	0	0	0	0
Everton	2005–06	Premier League	3	0	1	0	0	0	0	0	4	0
Everton	2006–07	Premier League	1	0	0	0	1	0	0	0	2	0
Everton	2007–08	Premier League	0	0	0	0	0	0	0	0	0	0
Everton	2008–09	Premier League	0	0	0	0	0	0	0	0	0	0
Everton	2009–10	Premier League	0	0	0	0	0	0	0	0	0	0
Everton	2010–11	Premier League	0	0	0	0	0	0	0	0	0	0
Everton	Total		4	0	1	0	1	0	0	0	6	0
Chester City (loan)	2003–04	Football Conference	12	0	0	0	—		0	0	12	0
Doncaster Rovers (loan)	2004–05	League One	8	0	0	0	—		0	0	8	0
Wycombe Wanderers (loan)	2005–06	League Two	3	0	0	0	0	0	1 (Note: Appearances in the Football League Trophy)	0	4	0
Crystal Palace (loan)	2006–07	Championship	5	0	0	0	—		—		5	0
Sheffield Wednesday (loan)	2006–07	Championship	11	0	0	0	—		—		11	0
Nottingham Forest (loan)	2008–09	Championship	3	0	0	0	0	0	—		3	0
Coventry City (loan)	2010–11	Championship	2	0	0	0	0	0	—		2	0
Preston North End (loan)	2010–11	Championship	17	0	0	0	0	0	—		17	0
Preston North End	2011–12	League One	11	1	0	0	1	0	0	0	12	1
Dunfermline Athletic (loan)	2011–12	Scottish Premier League	4	0	0	0	0	0	—		4	0
Sheffield United	2014–15	League One	11	0	0	0	0	0	2	0	13	0
Tranmere Rovers	2015–16	National League	1	0	1	0	—		0	0	2	0
Southport	2017–18	National League North	8	0	0	0	—		0	0	8	0
Career total			113	1	2	0	2	0	3	0	120	1
