= Paul Hopkins (footballer) =

English footballer

Personal information
- Full name: Paul David Hopkins
- Date of birth: 29 November 1986 (age 39)
- Place of birth: Liverpool, England
- Position: Striker

Youth career
- 2002–2005: Everton

Senior career*
Years	Team	Apps	(Gls)
2005–2006	Everton	0	(0)
2006	→ Darlington (loan)	5	(1)
2006	Waterford United	?	(0)
2006–2007	Bangor City	4	(2)

International career
2005	England U20	1	(0)
- * Club domestic league appearances and goals

Paul David Hopkins (born 29 November 1986 in Liverpool) is an English former professional footballer who played in the Football League for Darlington. He also played for Waterford United in the League of Ireland and for Bangor City in the Welsh Premier League.

Hopkins, a striker who can also play on the right wing, was a prolific goalscorer at schoolboy level with Liverpool. He then joined Everton's youth system, and was part of their squad for the 2002 FA Youth Cup Final, and continued scoring goals in the under-age teams. He signed professional forms in 2005, and made his debut for England under-20, on 16 August 2005 as a substitute in a 4–0 defeat to their Russian counterparts. He scored only infrequently for Everton's reserve team, and spent a month on loan at League Two club Darlington, during which he made his debut in the Football League, on 7 January 2006 in a 3–2 win against Notts County, and scored once. At the end of the 2005–06 season he was released by Everton.

Hopkins signed for League of Ireland Premier Division side Waterford United in July 2006, and joined Bangor City of the Welsh Premier League six months later.
